= Toad Hop, Indiana =

- Census-designated place
- Location of Toad Hop in Vigo County, Indiana.
- Coordinates: 39°27′29″N 87°27′52″W
- Country: United States
- State: Indiana
- County: Vigo
- Township: Sugar Creek

Area
  - Total: 0.21 sq mi (0.55 km^{2})
  - Land: 0.21 sq mi (0.55 km^{2})
  - Water: 0 sq mi (0.00 km^{2})
- Elevation: 469 ft (143 m)

Population (2020)
  - Total: 104
  - Density: 490.7/sq mi (189.46/km^{2})
- Time zone: UTC-5 (Eastern (EST))
  - Summer (DST): UTC-4 (EDT)
- ZIP code: 47885
- Area codes: 812, 930
- GNIS feature ID: 2583473

Toad Hop is an unincorporated census-designated place in Sugar Creek Township, Vigo County, in the U.S. state of Indiana. As of the 2020 census, Toad Hop had a population of 104. It is officially part of West Terre Haute. It is part of the Terre Haute metropolitan area.

== Name origin ==
The origin of the name Toad Hop is deeply rooted in legend. One explanation is that the town was laid out on a swampy field, and the abundance of toads and frogs hopping around inspired the name.

== Geography ==
Toad Hop is the mostly wooded area between the I-70 exit (Darwin Road) and US 40.

== Demographics ==
Historical population
| Census | Pop. | Note | %± |
|---|---|---|---|
| 2010 | 108 | | — |
| 2020 | 104 | | −3.7% |
U.S. Decennial Census

As of the 2010 Census, 108 people lived in Toad Hop. 107 residents were White and 1 was of two or more races. The median age was 40 years old.

== Education ==
All areas in Vigo County are in the Vigo County School Corporation. Toad Hop is zoned to Sugar Creek Consolidated Elementary School, West Vigo Middle School, and West Vigo High School.
