= Taylorville, Indiana =

- Unincorporated community
- Location of Taylorville in Vigo County, Indiana.
- Coordinates: 39°27′45″N 87°25′25″W
- Country: United States
- State: Indiana
- County: Vigo
- Township: Sugar Creek

Area
  - Total: 0.15 sq mi (0.39 km^{2})
  - Land: 0.15 sq mi (0.39 km^{2})
  - Water: 0 sq mi (0.00 km^{2})
- Elevation: 469 ft (143 m)

Population (2020)
  - Total: 38
  - Density: 251.9/sq mi (97.24/km^{2})
- Time zone: UTC-5 (Eastern (EST))
  - Summer (DST): UTC-4 (EDT)
- ZIP code: 47885
- Area codes: 812, 930
- FIPS code: 18-18658
- GNIS feature ID: 444608

Taylorville, also known as Taylorsville or Dresser, is an unincorporated community in eastern Sugar Creek Township, Vigo County, in the U.S. state of Indiana. It is part of the Terre Haute metropolitan area. Though the United States Board on Geographic Names has officially designated the area as Taylorville, the 2010 United States Census considered the area a census designated place called Dresser.

== History ==
Taylorville was founded in 1908, and was named after a local farmer named Taylor. A post office was established under the name Dresser in 1932, and remained in operation until it was discontinued in 1935. Residents use the names Taylorville and Dresser interchangeably.

Taylorville has historically had a reputation of being extremely poor and insular. A 1930s history of the village described it as “a breeding ground for all that was repugnant to American standards.” Residents of Taylorville have recalled being bullied as children for being from the village. Residents do acknowledge that the village is extremely close-knit but also say they are simply independent and keep to themselves.

Taylorville has declined in population in recent decades. The village is located in a floodplain and acquiring a permit to build a home in the village is difficult. As of 2013, Vigo County officials were attempting to purchase properties in Taylorville in an effort to remove residents from flood-prone residences. This plan has been met with resistance from Taylorville residents.

== Geography ==
Taylorville is located very near the Wabash River, the town is nestled between Terre Haute and West Terre Haute.

== Demographics ==
Historical population
Census	Pop.	Note	%±
2010	104		—
2020	38		−63.5%
U.S. Decennial Census

As of the 2010 Census, the CDP of Dresser had 104 residents. All 104 residents were White and the median age was 38 years old.

== Education ==
All areas in Vigo County are in the Vigo County School Corporation. Dresser is zoned to Sugar Creek Consolidated Elementary School, West Vigo Middle School, and West Vigo High School.
