= List of public art in Vigo County, Indiana =

This is a list of public art in Vigo County, Indiana.

This list applies only to works of public art accessible in an outdoor public space. For example, this does not include artwork visible inside a museum.

Most of the works mentioned are sculptures. When this is not the case (i.e. sound installation, for example) it is stated next to the title.

== Saint Mary-of-the-Woods ==
Title	Artist	Year	Location/GPS Coordinates	Material	Dimensions	Owner	Image
All Human Activities Result from the Conservation of Trees	Joanna Przybyla	1992	Saint Mary-of-the-Woods College	Beech, other woods, steel staples	Sculpture approx. H. 15 ft. x Diam. 6 ft.	Saint Mary-of-the-Woods College	
Grotto of Our Lady of Lourdes	Unknown	1918–1928	Saint Mary-of-the-Woods College	Marble	Mary: approx. 5 1/2 x 2 1/2 x 2 ft.; Bernadette: approx. 2 1/2 x 1 x 1 1/2 ft.; Grotto: approx. 25 x 75 x 8 ft.	Saint Mary-of-the-Woods College	
Our Lady of Fatima	L. N. Daleiden Company	1954	Saint Mary-of-the-Woods College	Marble	Mary: approx. 8 x 3 x 2 ft.; Base: approx. 3 x 2 x 2 ft.; Tallest child: approx. 3 x 1 1/2 x 2 1/2 ft.; Sheep: approx. 1 1/2 x 1 x 2 ft.	Saint Mary-of-the-Woods College	
Return to the East	John David Mooney	1976	Saint Mary-of-the-Woods College	Painted steel	Approx. 8 x 23 x 7 ft.	Saint Mary-of-the-Woods College	
St. Mary of the Woods	Adolph Wolter	1965	Saint Mary-of-the-Woods College	Limestone	Approx. 20 ft. x 5 ft. x 7 in.	Saint Mary-of-the-Woods College	
Way of the Cross	Frederick Pustet & Company	1938	Saint Mary-of-the-Woods College	Metal	14 parts. Each: approx. 6 x 4 x 2 ft.	Saint Mary-of-the-Woods College	

== Terre Haute ==
Title	Artist	Year	Location/GPS Coordinates	Material	Dimensions	Owner	Image
Call of the Sea	Harriet Whitney Frishmuth	1924	Rose–Hulman Institute of Technology	Bronze	Sculpture: approx. 3 ft. 7 in. x 19 in. x 29 in.	Rose–Hulman Institute of Technology	
Chauncey Rose Memorial	Miller & Yeager	1885	Fairbanks Park 39°27′36.09″N 87°25′3.62″W	Stone	2 units. Each sculpture: approx. 4 x 12 x 2 ft.; Structure: approx. 40 x 41 x 19 ft.	City of Terre Haute	
Lions	John Eberson	1915	Hippodrome Theatre39°27′55″N 87°24′21″W	Concrete	Large roundels, approx. Diam. 2 1/2 ft.; Small roundels: approx. Diam. 1 1/2 ft.		
Prometheus	John L. Laska	1963	Indiana State University, Science Building39°28′14.46″N 87°24′35.67″W	Reinforced concrete	Approx. 87 x 46 x 20 in.	Indiana State University	
Bas-Relief on St. Joseph Parish Center	Unknown	1888	St. Joseph University Parish39°27′53.38″N 87°24′41.28″W	Limestone	Approx. 14 ft. x 18 ft. x 7 in.	Roman Catholic Archdiocese of Indianapolis	
Sculpted Architectural Features of Reeve Hall	Unknown	1924	Indiana State University, Reeve Hall	Limestone		Indiana State University	
Saint Joseph, Patron of the Universal Church	Unknown	ca. 1900	St. Joseph University Parish	Stone	Approx. 5 ft. 6 in. x 2 ft. x 2 ft.	Roman Catholic Archdiocese of Indianapolis	
Soldiers and Sailors Monument	Rudolf Schwarz	1910	Vigo County Courthouse39°27′59″N 87°24′51.07″W	Bronze	5 figures. Flagbearer: approx. 11 x 3 x 3 ft.; Four lower figures: each approx. 6 ft. 8 in. x 2 ft. 6 in. x 2 ft. 6 in.	Vigo County Commissioners	
Terminal Arcade Facades	J.W. Quayle and Fred Elder	1911–1912	Terminal Arcade 39°28′0.40″N 87°24′17.97″W	Limestone and granite	Overall facade: approx. 35 ft. x 45 ft. x 10 in.		
Tootootch	Huston Isaacs & Charles Eggleston	1938	Vigo County Historical Society 39°27′7.94″N 87°24′36.42″W	White pine & Paint	Sculpture: approx. 20 x 7 x 2 1/2 ft.	Vigo County Historical Society	
Vietnam Veterans Memorial	Robert Crotty, Jr.	1988	Vigo County Courthouse39°27′59″N 87°24′51.07″W	Limestone	Sculpture: approx. 10 ft. x 11 ft. x 8 in.	Vigo County Commissioners	
Vigo County Courthouse Ornamentation	Samuel Hannaford	1888	Vigo County Courthouse39°27′59″N 87°24′51.07″W	Indiana limestone	4 reliefs. Each relief: approx. D. 8 in. x Diam. 5 ft.	Vigo County Commissioners	

== West Terre Haute ==
Title	Artist	Year	Location/GPS Coordinates	Material	Dimensions	Owner	Image
Sheets Monument	W.S. Evans	1880s	Sheets Cemetery	Limestone	Approx. 15 x 3 x 3 ft.	Darwin Road Cemetery Association	
