= Whitcomb Heights, Indiana =

- Unincorporated community
- Vigo County's location in Indiana

- Whitcomb Height's location in Vigo County
- Coordinates: 39°29′18″N 87°27′17″W
- Country: United States
- State: Indiana
- County: Vigo
- Township: Sugar Creek
- Elevation: 561 ft (171 m)
- Time zone: UTC-5 (Eastern (EST))
  - Summer (DST): UTC-4 (EDT)
- ZIP code: 47885
- Area codes: 812, 930
- GNIS feature ID: 445918

Whitcomb Heights is an unincorporated community in Sugar Creek Township, Vigo County, in the U.S. state of Indiana. It is officially part of West Terre Haute, Indiana. Whitcomb Heights is part of the Terre Haute metropolitan area.

== Geography ==
Whitcomb Heights is located at 39°29′18″N 87°27′17″W at an elevation of 561 feet. The community of Whitcomb Heights is located on an eminence alongside State Road 150.

== Community ==
There are no commercial or industrial businesses located in the area. Atop the hill the community is located on are many cornfields and residential dwellings . The tiny community is also home to a park known as Lee Fields Parks as tiny as the community is.
