= Marion Heights, Indiana =

- Unincorporated community
- Vigo County's location in Indiana

- location in Vigo County, Indiana
- Coordinates: 39°29′41″N 87°26′45″W
- Country: United States
- State: Indiana
- County: Vigo
- Township: Sugar Creek
- Elevation: 495 ft (151 m)
- Time zone: UTC-5 (Eastern (EST))
  - Summer (DST): UTC-4 (EDT)
- ZIP code: 47885
- Area codes: 812, 930
- GNIS feature ID: 438617

Marion Heights is an unincorporated community in northern Sugar Creek Township, Vigo County, in the U.S. state of Indiana.

It is part of the Terre Haute metropolitan area.

== Geography ==
Marion Heights is located at 39°29′41″N 87°26′45″W at an elevation of 495 feet.
