= Liggett, Indiana =

- Unincorporated community
- Vigo County's location in Indiana

- location in Vigo County, Indiana
- Coordinates: 39°28′45″N 87°29′01″W
- Country: United States
- State: Indiana
- County: Vigo
- Township: Sugar Creek
- Elevation: 512 ft (156 m)
- Time zone: UTC-5 (Eastern (EST))
  - Summer (DST): UTC-4 (EDT)
- ZIP code: 47885
- Area codes: 812, 930
- GNIS feature ID: 437878

Liggett is an unincorporated community in Sugar Creek Township, Vigo County, in the U.S. state of Indiana.

It is part of the Terre Haute metropolitan area.

== History ==
The community was likely named after the Liggett family of settlers.

== Geography ==
Liggett is located at 39°28′45″N 87°29′01″W at an elevation of 512 feet.
