= Harrison, Indiana =

- Unincorporated community
- Vigo County's location in Indiana

- location in Vigo County, Indiana
- Coordinates: 39°31′43″N 87°25′20″W
- Country: United States
- State: Indiana
- County: Vigo
- Township: Fayette
- Elevation: 456 ft (139 m)
- Time zone: UTC-5 (Eastern (EST))
  - Summer (DST): UTC-4 (EDT)
- ZIP code: 47885
- Area codes: 812, 930
- GNIS feature ID: 452218

Harrison is an unincorporated community in southeastern Fayette Township, Vigo County, in the U.S. state of Indiana.

It is part of the Terre Haute metropolitan area.

== History ==
Harrison was platted August 4, 1837, by Ann Potts, on the west side of the river from Fort Harrison, a military outpost in the region built in 1811 by General William Henry Harrison.

== Geography ==
Harrison is located at 39°31′43″N 87°25′20″W at an elevation of 456 feet.
