= Prairieton =

Prairieton may refer to a place in the United States:

- Prairieton, Indiana
- Prairieton Township, Christian County, Illinois
