= List of schools in the Terre Haute metropolitan area =

Terre Haute and its metropolitan area are served by public school districts and private schools. Terre Haute also has three local universities.

== Colleges and universities ==
- Indiana State University
- Ivy Tech Community College of Indiana - Terre Haute campus
- Rose-Hulman Institute of Technology
- Saint Mary-of-the-Woods College

== Public school systems ==
=== Vigo County School Corporation ===
VCSC is the school district for Terre Haute and Vigo County. It operates three traditional high schools along with two alternative schools and numerous elementary and middle schools.

- Terre Haute North Vigo High School
- Terre Haute South Vigo High School
- West Vigo High School
- Washington Alternative High School
- McLean Education Center

=== Southwest School Corporation ===
The Southwest School Corporation serves a portion of Sullivan County, Indiana.

- Sullivan High School

=== Northeast School Corporation ===
The Northeast School Corporation serves a portion of Sullivan County, Indiana.

- North Central High School
- Union High School

=== Clay Community Schools ===
CCS serves all of Clay County and a portion of Parke County.

- Clay City High School
- Northview High School

=== North Vermillion Community School Corporation ===
The NVCSC serves the northern portion of Vermillion County.

- North Vermillion High School

=== South Vermillion Community School Corporation ===
The SVCSC serves the southern portion of Vermillion County.

- South Vermillion High School

== Private schools ==
- Saint Patrick School
- John Paul II Catholic High School
