= Bethany Congregational Church =

Bethany Congregational Church may refer to:

in the United States

(by state)

- Bethany Congregational Church (Thomasville, Georgia), listed on the NRHP in Georgia
- Bethany Congregational Church (West Terre Haute, Indiana), listed on the NRHP in Indiana
- Bethany Congregational Church (Quincy, Massachusetts), listed on the NRHP in Massachusetts
