= Prairieton Township, Vigo County, Indiana =

Prairieton Township
- Township
- Location in Vigo County
- Coordinates: 39°21′33″N 87°30′11″W
- Country: United States
- State: Indiana
- County: Vigo

Government
  - Type: Indiana township

Area
  - Total: 18.51 sq mi (47.9 km^{2})
  - Land: 17.83 sq mi (46.2 km^{2})
  - Water: 0.68 sq mi (1.8 km^{2}) 3.67%
- Elevation: 460 ft (140 m)

Population (2020)
  - Total: 1,130
  - Density: 68.6/sq mi (26.5/km^{2})
- Time zone: UTC-5 (Eastern (EST))
  - Summer (DST): UTC-4 (EDT)
- ZIP code: 47870
- GNIS feature ID: 453775

Prairieton Township is one of twelve townships in Vigo County, Indiana, United States. As of the 2010 census, its population was 1,222 and it contained 517 housing units.

== Geography ==
According to the 2010 census, the township has a total area of 18.51 square miles (47.9 km^{2}), of which 17.83 square miles (46.2 km^{2}) (or 96.33%) is land and 0.68 square miles (1.8 km^{2}) (or 3.67%) is water.

=== Cities, towns, villages ===
- Terre Haute (west edge)

=== Unincorporated communities ===
- Prairieton

=== Adjacent townships ===
- Sugar Creek Township (north)
- Honey Creek Township (east)
- Linton Township (southeast)
- Prairie Creek Township (southwest)
- Darwin Township, Clark County, Illinois (west)
- Wabash Township, Clark County, Illinois (northwest)

=== Cemeteries ===
The township contains New Harmony Cemetery. Prairieton Cemetery is located in Prairieton, Indiana.

=== Airports and landing strips ===
- Higginbotham Field

=== Landmarks ===
- Federal Bureau of Prisons Terre Haute Penitentiary (west edge)

== School districts ==
- Vigo County School Corporation

== Political districts ==
- Indiana's 8th congressional district
- State House District 45
- State Senate District 39

== Municipal ==
- Praireton/Prairie Creek Fire Protection District
- The Fire Departments from Prairieton Township and Prairie Creek Township merged to form a Fire Protection District on August 16, 2007.
