= Barnhart Town, Indiana =

- Unincorporated community
- Vigo County's location in Indiana

- Barnhart Town's location in Vigo County, Indiana
- Coordinates: 39°30′14″N 87°26′08″W
- Country: United States
- State: Indiana
- County: Vigo
- Township: Sugar Creek
- Elevation: 479 ft (146 m)
- Time zone: UTC-5 (Eastern (EST))
  - Summer (DST): UTC-4 (EDT)
- ZIP code: 47885
- Area codes: 812, 930
- GNIS feature ID: 430517

Barnhart Town is an unincorporated community in Sugar Creek Township, Vigo County, in the U.S. state of Indiana.

It is part of the Terre Haute metropolitan area.

== Geography ==
Barnhart Town is located at 39°30′14″N 87°26′08″W at an elevation of 482 feet.
