= Sugar Creek Township, Vigo County, Indiana =

Sugar Creek Township
- Township
- Logo

- Location in Vigo County
- Coordinates: 39°27′34″N 87°28′49″W
- Country: United States
- State: Indiana
- County: Vigo

Government
  - Type: Indiana township
  - Trustee: Darrick Scott

Area
  - Total: 45.75 sq mi (118.5 km^{2})
  - Land: 44.18 sq mi (114.4 km^{2})
  - Water: 1.57 sq mi (4.1 km^{2}) 3.43%
- Elevation: 520 ft (160 m)

Population (2020)
  - Total: 7,175
  - Density: 161.9/sq mi (62.5/km^{2})
- Time zone: UTC-5 (Eastern (EST))
  - Summer (DST): UTC-4 (EDT)
- ZIP codes: 47802, 47876, 47885
- GNIS feature ID: 453886
- Website: sugarcreektwptrustee.com

Sugar Creek Township is one of twelve townships in Vigo County, Indiana, United States. As of the 2021 census, the population is 7,162 individual people, with the median age being 43.2.

== Geography ==
According to the 2010 census, the township has a total area of 45.75 square miles (118.5 km^{2}), of which 44.18 square miles (114.4 km^{2}) (or 96.57%) is land and 1.57 square miles (4.1 km^{2}) (or 3.43%) is water.

=== Cities, towns, villages ===
- West Terre Haute

=== Unincorporated communities ===
- Dresser (Taylorville)
- Barnhart Town
- Ferguson Hill
- Larimer Hill
- Liggett
- Marion Heights
- Saint Mary-of-the-Woods
- State Line
- Toad Hop
- Whitcomb Heights

=== Adjacent townships ===
- Fayette Township (north)
- Otter Creek Township (northeast)
- Harrison Township (east)
- Honey Creek Township (southeast)
- Prairieton Township (south)
- Wabash Township, Clark County, Illinois (west)
- Elbridge Township, Edgar County, Illinois (northwest)

=== Cemeteries ===
The township contains Sheets Cemetery.

=== Lakes ===
- Izack Walton Lake
- North Lake
- South Lake

== History ==
On May 9, 1820, by order of the county commissioners the present boundaries were established, as Sugar Creek Township was cut off from Wabash Township, which at that time included all that part of Vigo County lying west of the Wabash River. The first settlers found it wholly covered in timber of large growth. Its general surface is rolling and in places broken. It has an area of about 27,000 acres (110 km^{2}), most of which is arable, and abounds in bituminous coal and limestone. It is well watered by small streams. Sugar Creek, the largest and the township's namesake, has several branches which flow through the central part of the township from the west and northwest, and empty into the Wabash River one and a half miles south of the National Road. Clear Creek, the next in size, flows through the southern part and empties into the Wabash three and a half miles south of the mouth of Sugar Creek.

The first settlement was made in 1818, and the first settlers were James Bennett, John Sheets, John Ray, Henry Kuykendall, John Reese, Reuben Newton, James Hicklin, Joseph Malcom, Micajah Goodman, Henry Hearn, Henry Middleton and John Cruse. Joseph Malcom was the first road supervisor, and John Ray was the first inspector of elections; they were appointed by the county commissioners on May 9, 1820. John Reese was the first justice of the peace; he was chosen at an election (the first held in the township) held at the house of John Ray on the first Saturday in June. It is said that Daniel Kuykendall was the first child born. The first saw-mill was built by James Sturgess, in 1820, on the S. W. 1/4 of Sec. 24, T. 12, R. 9 W, About this time James Bennett built a grist mill on the N. W. 1/4 of Sec. 30, T. 12, R. 9 W., and sometime after connected with it an oil-mill and carding machine, and on the same section, in 1824, built the first brick house. In 1831 Joseph Malcom was granted permission to establish and keep a public ferry over the Wabash river, now known as Cox's ferry. In the autumn of 1846 George Broadhurst sank the first coal shaft, in the S. W. corner of the S. W. 1/4 of Sec. 19, T. 12, R. 9 W. Previous to this date coal had been dug at different places, but no regular mining for profit was carried on until Mr. Broadhurst had sunk his shaft.

=== Towns ===
Macksville, named after its founder, Samuel McQuilkin, but eventually renamed West Terre Haute, is located in a fertile plain one mile (1.6 km) west of Terre Haute; when the land was surveyed into lots is now unknown. The plat was recorded November 28, 1836. In 1833 the first dwelling house was built within what three years later became the legal boundaries of the present town. About one or two years later Samuel McQuilkin opened a store and Smith Finch a tavern. These institutions were largely patronized by those who were employed in the construction of the National Road, which was winding its way westward through the site of the future metropolis of Sugar Creek Township. The town has now a population of 250; two stores which do a fair business, blacksmith and wheelwright shop for custom work, saw-mill, shingle machine and cigar factory. Its manufactures, therefore, consist of lumbar, shingles and cigars, and the present strongly indicates that in the near future grape wine will be added. Vegetable gardening is a growing and profitable interest. In the autumn of 1867 John Griggs and his son Edward erected a custom flour-mill, and in the following spring commenced grinding. They continued to run the mill successfully until August 8, 1870, when it was struck by lightning and entirely consumed by fire. There is no church edifice in the town and but one organized religious society, which is Methodist Episcopal, with a membership of sixty-seven. It holds its meetings in the public school-house, located near the center of the town. This society has connected with it a prosperous Sabbath-school which holds its sessions each Sabbath morning in the school-house. There is also a Union Sabbath-school in good working order, which occupies the public school-house each Sabbath afternoon. These organizations are working harmoniously and doing much to aid the cause of Christianity. During the past few years, at different times, saloons have been licensed to vend alcoholic liquors, but in a very short time were compelled to cease their traffic because of the radical temperance sentiment which prevails almost universally.

The most notable event which has transpired in its history of forty-four years is the murder of Eva Peters, which was committed on the morning of March 15, 1875. Eva was an elderly maiden lady living alone in a small house in the village. Who her murderers are will probably never be known; what the motives were which impelled them to commit the horrible deed are yet a mystery to the community. Miss Peters had deposited in bank in Terre Haute a few dollars, the earnings of toil which she was saving to be expended to give her a "Christian burial." This money she drew out of the bank the day before she was murdered. The possession of this small sum is supposed to be the incentive to the commission of the bloody crime; if so, the murderers were disappointed, for the money was found, after the body was discovered, concealed in her bed.

Bloomtown was a village of fifty inhabitants six miles (10 km) west of Terre Haute on the Paris road, and a half mile north of the Vandalia railroad. It is located in a rich and extensive bottom, through which the waters of Sugar creek flow. It was laid out in 1858 by Hiram Bloom, after whom it was named. When Mr. Bloom settled here is not ascertained. He is reputed to have been a very active and enterprising man. In the earlier days of Bloomtown a saw-mill, and in later years a merchant flour-mill, were the pride of the villagers. The mills were destroyed by fire. The dates of their founding and destruction we could not ascertain definitely. For a number of years the manufacture of lumber was a leading source of employment and revenue, as the bottom was densely covered with black-walnut timber. It contains a blacksmith shop, which is opened occasionally to the public, and one store, the proprietor of which is postmaster. The name of the post-office is Nelson. It has a semi-weekly mail.

St. Mary's is a village of 100 inhabitants adjacent to the community of the Sisters of Providence. Its site was never divided into town lots. It contains two stores, a cabinet, carpenter, blacksmith and cooper shop, and a brick church which was built in 1867 and cost $13,000. The only secular organization here is a St. Joseph's Total Abstinence Society, at one time numbering ninety members; it now numbers fifty. This society has accomplished much good, and its continuance should be encouraged. In religion the villagers are Catholic, who have been induced to locate here because of the growth and prosperity of the Academic Institute, so successfully conducted by the Sisters of Providence. The village has grown to its present size within the past thirty-five years without any effort to build up a town.

=== Churches ===
New Hope was the first church built in the township. It was built in 1824 by members of the Presbyterian denomination. It was constructed of huge black poplar logs hewn on two sides. Each one engaged in building this pioneer temple contributed a log. The church, like many of those who worshipped in it, has long ago died; there is now no vestige remaining to mark its site; when the society was organized is now not known. The first temperance lecture delivered in this township was at this church, in 1828. The lecturer, Rev. Samuel Baldridge, a native of North Carolina, was an eloquent and enthusiastic advocate of temperance, and an uncompromising anti-slavery man. The doctrines proclaimed by him fell upon his auditors like a thunderbolt from a clear sky; they were struck with astonishment at the boldness of the speaker and the strange doctrine he taught. Astonishment gave place to anger, and threats of violence were boldly uttered. The excitement increased, reaching out and embracing neighborhoods beyond that of the church; several with their teams went to the church for the purpose of taking out of its walls the logs which they had contributed. At that day the use of alcoholic liquors as a beverage was a prevailing custom in almost every family throughout the township, hence temperance lecturers were regarded as disturbers of the peace. Mr. Baldridge was a brave man and continued to lecture occasionally on his favorite theme in the church. His labor was crowned with success by organizing a temperance society of one hundred and one members.

Pisgah Methodist Episcopal church was built in 1839, on Sec. 4, T. 12, R. 10 W., and completed in the autumn of 1840. John M. Reese was the architect and builder. The timber for the frame was hewn and the weather-boards sawn with a whip-saw. On the night of December 24, 1877, it was destroyed by fire. Since the church was burned the society holds its meetings in the district school-house. It is said to be the first Methodist Episcopal society organized in the township; when it was the first organized there is no written record. The society is in good working condition, and since 1840 has under its watchcare a Sabbath-school which numbers sixty scholars, which also meets in the district school-house.

Bethesda Methodist Episcopal church is an unpretentious one-story frame building, located on the N. E. 1/4 of Sec. 23, T. 12, R. 10 W., three and a half miles west of Terre Haute, and a half mile south of the Paris road. It was built in 1849 and completed in 1852. When the society was first organized is unknown. Connected with it is a flourishing and Sabbath-school. Both are working in harmony.

West Vigo is located on the S. E. 1/4 of Sec. 14, T. 12, R. 10 W., four miles (6 km) west of Terre Haute, on the Paris Road. W. W. and John B. Goodman, with ten others, withdrew from the Presbyterian society of New Hope church and convened together on 20 December 1849, and organized the first society of the Congregational denomination in the township. This little society did not remain quiescent, but at once inaugurated measures for the erection of a temple to worship in, and with the aid from the Congregational building fund built, at an expenditure of $800, and dedicated on the first day of May, 1853, what is now known as West Vigo Congregational church. It is a plain one-story frame edifice, 28 x 38 feet (12 m).

South Vigo Congregational church is a plain frame edifice, located on the N. W. 1/4 of Sec. 21, T. 11, R. 10 W. It was built in 1859. The society was organized in the log school-house, which was erected in 1853, where the present school-house of District No. 15 now stands, on the S. E. cor. of the N. W. 1/3 of Sec. 15, T. 11, R. 10 W.

=== Education ===
In the early days of the township, there was no system of public instruction; the means for acquiring an education were very limited and discouraging. Then a few settlers together erected a log cabin, in which there was a fireplace extending several feet across one end. In this the fire, for warming the house, was built of logs its entire length, requiring several boys to carry each log into the house and place it in position. A log was sawn out of each side of the building and the spaces were closed with paper which had been oiled with lard; this oiled paper served as windows. The seats were logs split into halves and supported by round sticks; the writing desks were of similar pattern, and the door was constructed of split logs, fastened together with wooden pine and hung with wooden hinges. In the construction of these pioneer seminaries not a nail was used. It was not unusual for boys to travel three or four miles (6 km) through dense woods, to school, blazing their way the first time going over the route. Those seats of learning are now gone, and the recollection of them is rapidly fading from memory. Wonderful, indeed, are the changes and advances made within the last sixty years in the means for acquiring an education. The township has now a system of free schools of which any people should be proud. It is now divided into ten districts, and in each is located a comfortable and substantial school-house of modern architecture, within a short distance of each child. Every boy and girl in the township, between the ages of six and twenty-one years, can now obtain an education that will fit them to transact the ordinary business of life. The following statistics show the present status of education in the township: Number of schools taught, 9; number of public school-houses, 10; value of school-houses, $5,000; value of school apparatus, $480; amount of special revenue, $820.33; amount of revenue for tuition, $5,790.31; average compensation paid to teachers per day, $1.36; daily average attendance, 336; average number of days taught during the year, 180; township library volumes, 375. There is no public school taught in district No. 2; the people of this district are Catholic, and patronize their church parochial school. In not sustaining a public school they are deprived of the district's share of the public school fund.

=== St. Mary-of-the-Woods ===
Bishop Brute, the first bishop of Vincennes, desiring to establish in his diocese religious sisters from some community in France, his native land, commissioned Rev. C. de la Hailandiers, his vicar-general, who was then in France, to apply for some sisters who would be courageous enough to leave the land of their nativity and devote themselves to the instruction of youth in the wilds of America; bid adieu to all that was near and dear to them in the world, for at that time going to America was considered in the same light of going to the country beyond the grave, without the faintest hope of ever returning. On the recommendation of a priest of the diocese of Rennes, the vicar-general of Vincennes applied in the name of Bishop Brute to the superiors of the Sisters of Providence, at Ruille-sur-Loir, in the diocese of Mans, to obtain sisters for the mission of Vincennes. Bishop Bonvier, of Mans, and superiors of Ruille, promised him to consider the matter and do their best to grant their request. Meanwhile, Bishop Brute died, and his vicar-general was appointed his successor in 1839, and was consecrated the same year at Paris. He went to Ruille' at the epoch of the annual retreat of the sisters in September. He spoke so forcibly to Mother Mary, superior-general at that time, of the spiritual wants and destitution of the children of his diocese, that she, with the approval of the bishop of Le Mans, consented to send a colony of sisters. It was decided they would start the next summer. In July, 1840, sisters Theodore, Basilide, Olympiade, Mary Liguori, St. Vincent and Mary Xavier, three professed sisters and three novices, parted from their dear community and started in quest of their future field of labor. Mother Theodore and her sisters, having received the blessing of Bishop Bouvier, of Mans, proceeded to Havre, where they embarked for New York on July 26, and arrived on September 8, after a painful sea voyage of forty days. After a short rest they went to Philadelphia, then to Baltimore. From Baltimore they traveled to Vincennes in the company of a Canadian priest, who was going there to see the bishop. From Baltimore they traveled night and day in a stage coach to Wheeling; from Wheeling they descended the Ohio river in a boat to Madison; here they met Bishop de la Hailandiere, who was visiting missions, and after his promising to rejoin them in a few days they proceeded to Vincennes. Father Buteux, a French priest who was residing at St. Mary's, came to the Episcopal city and conducted the weary travelers to their destination, where they arrived on October 22, 1840, after a painful and tedious journey of ninety days. St. Mary's at that time consisted of a small frame house, the dwelling of a farmer, Joseph Thrall. There were besides, two or three log huts in the forest at different places in the vicinity, also an unfinished brick house that the bishop was building for the sisters, which had been commenced the month before their arrival, and a log church 10 feet (3.0 m) square, in which Father Buteux, who was the first chaplain of the community, officiated. It had no altar, no tabernacle, but on a board placed on logs was a small pyx, in which was kept the blessed sacrament. Mr. Thrall shared his house with the sisters, of which in a few weeks became sole possessors by purchase; it had four small rooms, and the best one was immediately converted into a chapel. In November, 1841, Sister St. Frances, who had been detained by ill health, arrived at St. Mary's, to the great joy and delight of the little community. From that day her name is all along joined with that of Mother Theodore in the most important events and transactions of the community of which she became mistress of novices. During a space of about seven years the young community was submitted to the greatest tribulations that can be imagined; it proved a time of almost constant struggle, anguish and agony. Those days of pain were succeeded by peaceful ones, only occasionally illness came to threaten the lives of Mother Theodore and Sister St. Frances. Sister St. Frances died January 31, 1856, and Mother Theodore, the foundress of the community, died May 14, three months after Sister St. Frances. Great is the difference between the first house occupied by the pioneer sisters and the present beautiful and imposing Academy of St. Mary's of the Woods and the comfortable mother-house adjoining it. Then a log house was the chapel and at the same time the residence of the priest; two small rooms, half the dwelling-house of a kind farmer, constituted the convent home. The academy building in process of erection then was a neat, small, brick edifice, with basement and attic, consisting of six rooms. The few sisters that came had then to fulfill every office and duty, besides facing all the difficulties with only such resources as their solitude could afford. The railroad was not made then, and sometimes all communications with Terre Haute were prevented by water that filled the river bottom, which extended halfway between the two places. Since the St. Louis, Terre Haute & Indianapolis railroad is established, communications have become very easy. The community now numbers more than 300 sisters, including novices. The epoch of the annual retreat is August 7, at which time they all visit their mother home. The Sisters of Providence have under their direction thirty-three branch establishments, located in the states of Indiana, Michigan and Illinois, and two orphan asylums; one for boys at Vincennes, the other at Terre Haute, for girls. In 1839, Bishop de la Hailandiere, purchased 119 acres (0.48 km^{2}) of land for the pioneers. It was covered with timber except about 30 acres (120,000 m^{2}). The community now owns over 300 acres (1.2 km^{2}). Of the seven pioneer sisters, five rest from their earthly labors; two, Sisters Olympiade and Mary Xavier, yet remain to aid the community with their matured experience and wisdom.

Foley Hall was listed on the National Register of Historic Places in 1985.

== School districts ==
- Vigo County School Corporation

== Political districts ==
- Indiana's 8th congressional district
- State House District 42
- State House District 45
- State Senate District 38
