= State Line, Vigo County, Indiana =

State Line
- Unincorporated community
- Vigo County's location in Indiana

- location in Vigo County, Indiana
- Coordinates: 39°26′13″N 87°31′46″W
- Country: United States
- State: Indiana
- County: Vigo
- Township: Sugar Creek
- Elevation: 561 ft (171 m)
- Time zone: UTC-5 (Eastern (EST))
  - Summer (DST): UTC-4 (EDT)
- ZIP code: 47885
- Area codes: 812, 930
- GNIS feature ID: 444087

State Line is an unincorporated community in western Sugar Creek Township, Vigo County, in the U.S. state of Indiana.

Named for its proximity to the state border between Indiana and Illinois, it is part of the Terre Haute metropolitan area.

== Geography ==
State Line is located at 39°26′13″N 87°31′46″W at an elevation of 561 feet.
