= Hutton, Indiana =

- Unincorporated community
- Vigo County's location in Indiana

- location in Vigo County, Indiana
- Coordinates: 39°19′03″N 87°32′02″W
- Country: United States
- State: Indiana
- County: Vigo
- Township: Prairie Creek
- Elevation: 456 ft (139 m)
- Time zone: UTC-5 (Eastern (EST))
  - Summer (DST): UTC-4 (EDT)
- ZIP code: 47802
- Area codes: 812, 930
- GNIS feature ID: 436664

Hutton is an unincorporated community in northern Prairie Creek Township, Vigo County, in the U.S. state of Indiana.

It is part of the Terre Haute metropolitan area.

== History ==
Hutton was founded in 1833, and was named after the Hutton family of settlers. A post office was established at Hutton in 1889, and remained in operation until it was discontinued in 1906.

== Geography ==
Hutton is located at 39°19′03″N 87°32′02″W at an elevation of 456 feet.
