= Prairieton, Indiana =

- Unincorporated community
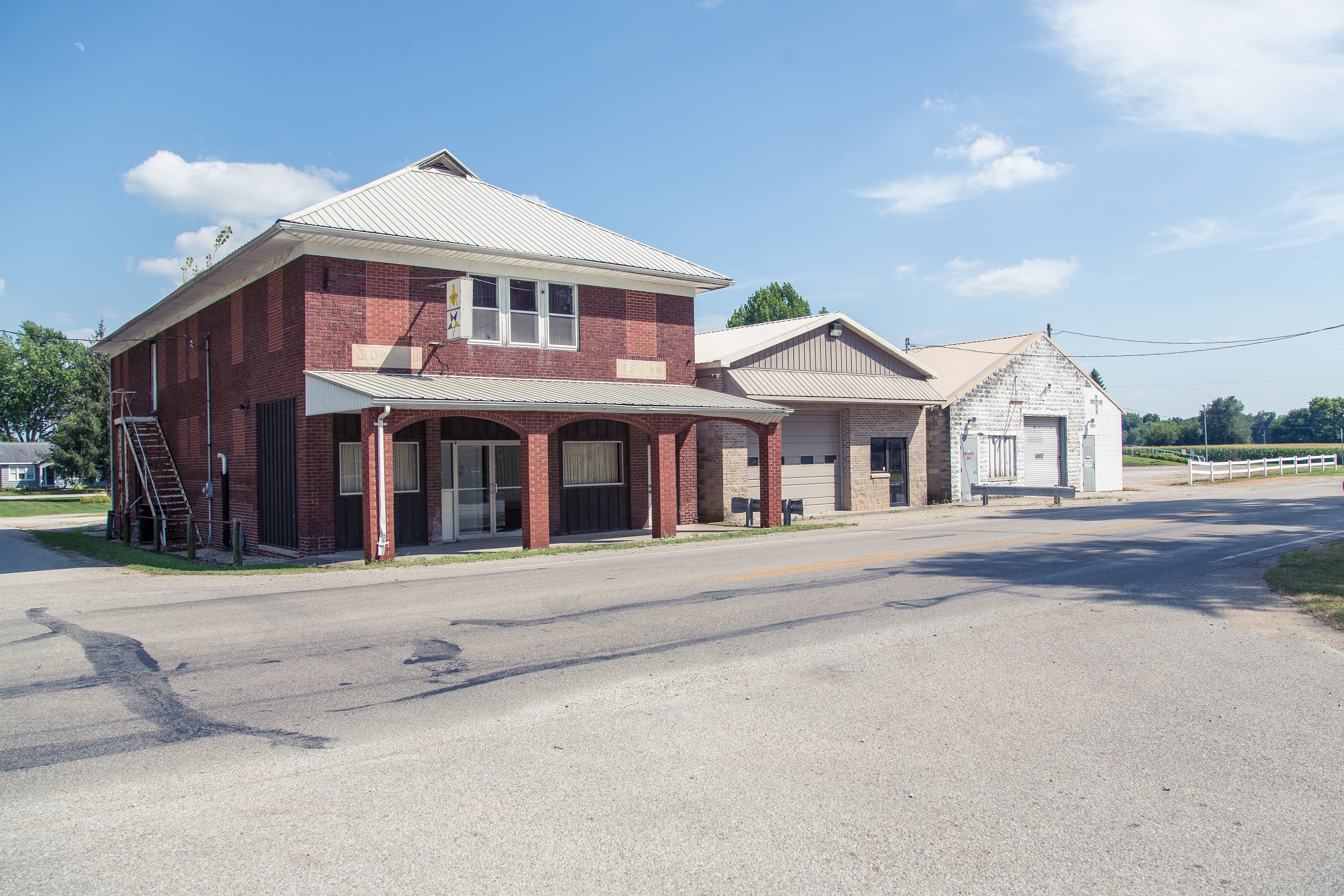
- Street scene in Prairieton

- Vigo County's location in Indiana

- Location in Vigo County, Indiana
- Coordinates: 39°22′12″N 87°28′28″W
- Country: United States
- State: Indiana
- County: Vigo
- Township: Prairieton
- Elevation: 479 ft (146 m)
- Time zone: UTC-5 (Eastern (EST))
  - Summer (DST): UTC-4 (EDT)
- ZIP code: 47802
- Area codes: 812, 930
- FIPS code: 18-61758
- GNIS feature ID: 2830569

Prairieton is an unincorporated community in Prairieton Township, Vigo County, in the U.S. state of Indiana. Today, due to its proximity to both Terre Haute's southern shopping district (along U.S. Route 41 for approximately two miles south of Interstate 70) and the Terre Haute Federal Penitentiary, it has mostly become a commuter town (State Road 63 provides Prairieton residents access to Terre Haute), with fewer than ten businesses within its "city limits".

Prairieton is part of the Terre Haute Metropolitan Statistical Area.

== History ==
Prairieton was laid out July 22, 1837, by Robert Hoggatt. Situated on Honey Creek, the town also was on the old Vincennes wagon road. Moses Hoggatt had established a post office and store there around 1818, and in its early years the town was known simply as Hoggatt's Store. Hoggatt and then his son Robert Hoggatt were the first shopkeepers. The Quakers were the predominating influence in this prairie in the pioneer days. It became incorporated as a town in 1870 and by 1890 had a population of approximately 236.

A post office was established under the name Hoggatts in 1818. It was renamed to Prairieton in 1840, and is still currently in operation.

== Demographics ==
The United States Census Bureau defined Prairieton as a census designated place in the 2022 American Community Survey.
