= Foley Hall =

- Formerly listed on the U.S. National Register of Historic Places
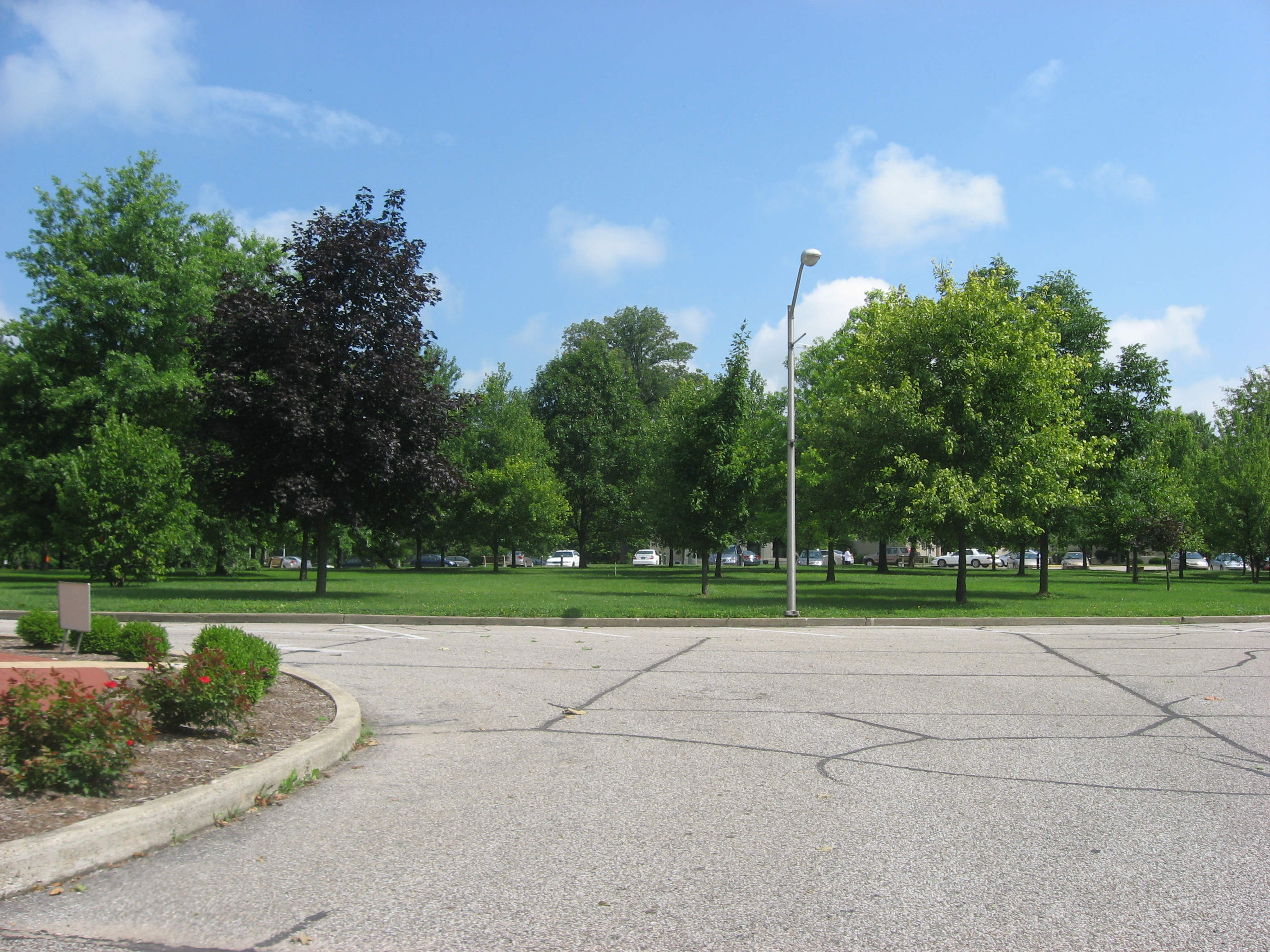
- Foley Hall site, July 2011

- Location within Vigo County, Indiana Location within Indiana Location within the United States
- Location: St. Mary of the Woods College Campus, Off US 150, St. Mary-of-the-Woods, Indiana
- Coordinates: 39°30′38″N 87°27′44″W
- Area: 2 acres (0.81 ha)
- Built: 1860, 1897
- Architect: Bohlen, Dietrich A.
- Architectural style: Renaissance
- NRHP reference No.: 85000595

Significant dates
- Added to NRHP: March 21, 1985
- Removed from NRHP: March 5, 2019

Foley Hall was a historic building located on the campus of Saint Mary-of-the-Woods College in Sugar Creek Township, Vigo County, Indiana. The building consisted of a three-story, three wing, brick structure built in 1860, fronted by a 4 1/2-story, Renaissance Revival style limestone addition built in 1897. The building was topped by a flat roof with a large cupola topped by a spire. It featured a two-story, central pediment supported by Corinthian order columns. Foley Hall was demolished in 1989.

It was listed on the National Register of Historic Places in 1985, and was delisted in 2019.
