= Prairie Creek Township, Vigo County, Indiana =

Prairie Creek Township
- Township
- Location in Vigo County
- Coordinates: 39°17′52″N 87°31′53″W
- Country: United States
- State: Indiana
- County: Vigo

Government
  - Type: Indiana township

Area
  - Total: 38.55 sq mi (99.8 km^{2})
  - Land: 37.99 sq mi (98.4 km^{2})
  - Water: 0.56 sq mi (1.5 km^{2}) 1.45%
- Elevation: 489 ft (149 m)

Population (2020)
  - Total: 1,067
  - Density: 31.5/sq mi (12.2/km^{2})
- Time zone: UTC-5 (Eastern (EST))
  - Summer (DST): UTC-4 (EDT)
- ZIP codes: 47802, 47850
- GNIS feature ID: 453774

Prairie Creek Township is one of twelve townships in Vigo County, Indiana, United States. As of the 2010 census, its population was 1,195 and it contained 494 housing units.

== Geography ==
According to the 2010 census, the township has a total area of 38.55 square miles (99.8 km^{2}), of which 37.99 square miles (98.4 km^{2}) (or 98.55%) is land and 0.56 square miles (1.5 km^{2}) (or 1.45%) is water.

=== Unincorporated communities ===
- Hutton
- Prairie Creek
- Vigo

=== Adjacent townships ===
- Prairieton Township (northeast)
- Linton Township (east)
- Curry Township, Sullivan County (southeast)
- Fairbanks Township, Sullivan County (south)
- York Township, Clark County, Illinois (southwest)
- Darwin Township, Clark County, Illinois (west)

=== Cemeteries ===
The township contains these four cemeteries: Lykens, Shattuck, Watson and Westlawn.

=== Rivers ===
- Wabash River

== School districts ==
- Vigo County School Corporation

== Political districts ==
- Indiana's 8th congressional district
- State House District 45
- State Senate District 39
