= 1908 United States presidential election in Indiana =

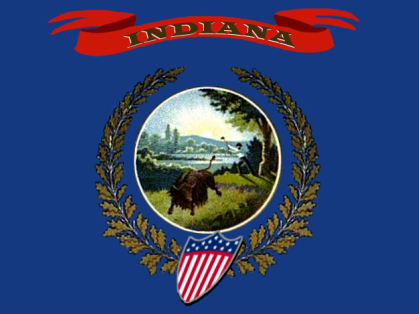
- November 3, 1908
- Turnout: 89.9% ▲0.2 pp
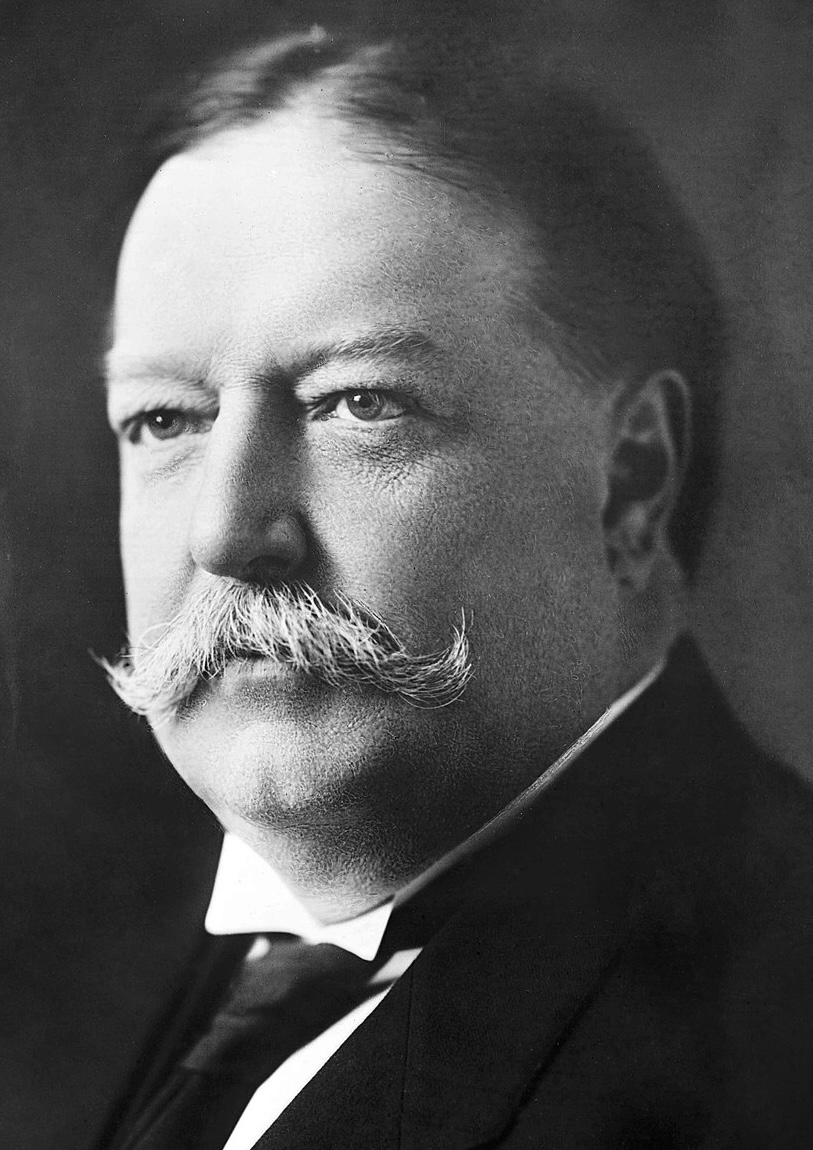

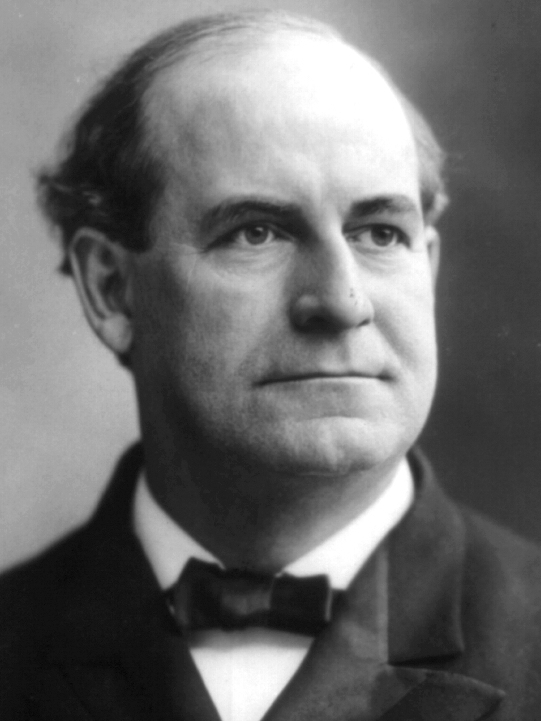
Nominee	William Howard Taft	William Jennings Bryan
Party	Republican	Democratic
Home state	Ohio	Nebraska
Running mate	James S. Sherman	John W. Kern
Electoral vote	15	0
Popular vote	348,993	338,262
Percentage	48.40%	46.91%
County results
Taft
40–50%
50–60%
60–70%
Bryan
40–50%
50–60%
60–70%
President before election
Theodore Roosevelt
Republican
Elected President
William Howard Taft
Republican

A presidential election was held in Indiana on November 3, 1908, as part of the 1908 United States presidential election. The Republican ticket of the U.S. secretary of war William Howard Taft and the U.S. representative from New York's 27th congressional district James S. Sherman defeated the Democratic ticket of the former U.S. representative from Nebraska's 1st congressional district William Jennings Bryan and the former U.S. senator from Indiana John W. Kern. Taft defeated Bryan in the national election with 321 electoral votes.

== Background ==
Partisan coalitions in Indiana at the turn of the century reflected the regional, ethnic, and religious roots of the settler population, with the descendants of White Southerners, German Americans, and Irish Americans (especially Catholics) voting reliably Democratic, while Yankees, Nordic and Scandinavian Americans, and British Americans favored the Republican Party. Southern Indiana leaned Democratic and Northern Indiana leaned Republican, in line with the loose correlation between ethnicity and geography. The state's notable concentration of German Catholics contributed to its closeness in presidential elections during the Third Party System relative to other Lower North states. Bryan's previous campaigns in 1896 and 1900 had seen the state move more securely into the Republican column, as German Catholics alienated by Bryan's outspoken Evangelicalism, conservatives unnerved by the candidate's agrarian radicalism, and urban workers frightened by threats of mass layoffs in the event of a Bryan victory voted Republican for the first time.

== General election ==
=== Results ===
Indiana chose 15 electors on a statewide general ticket. State law required voters to elect each member of the Electoral College individually, rather than as a group. This sometimes resulted in small differences in the number of votes cast for electors pledged to the same presidential candidate, if some voters did not vote for all the electors nominated by a party. The following table quotes the official returns published by the secretary of state of Indiana, which list the votes for the first elector on each ticket.

1908 United States presidential election in Indiana (Note: The official returns list 18,045 votes for the leading Prohibition elector, but the county results add up to 18,036.)
Party	Candidate	Votes	%	±%
Republican	William Howard Taft James S. Sherman	348,993	48.40	▼5.58
Democratic	William Jennings Bryan John W. Kern	338,262	46.91	▲6.69
Prohibition	Eugene W. Chafin Aaron S. Watkins	18,036	2.50	▼0.94
Socialist	Eugene V. Debs Ben Hanford	13,476	1.87	▲0.87
Populist	Thomas E. Watson Samuel Williams	1,193	0.16	▼0.20
Socialist Labor	August Gillhaus Donald L. Munro	643	0.09	▼0.14
Independence	Thomas L. Hisgen John Temple Graves	514	0.07	▲0.07
Total votes		721,117	100.00	

=== Results by county ===
1908 United States presidential election in Indiana by county
County	William H. Taft Republican		William J. Bryan Democratic		Eugene W. Chafin Prohibition		Eugene V. Debs Socialist		Others		Margin		Total
County	Votes	%	Votes	%	Votes	%	Votes	%	Votes	%	Votes	%	Total
Adams	1,726	32.63%	3,404	64.36%	141	2.67%	13	0.25%	5	0.09%	-1,678	-31.73%	5,289
Allen	9,468	42.06%	12,145	53.95%	340	1.51%	494	2.19%	66	0.29%	-2,677	-11.89%	22,513
Bartholomew	3,306	46.13%	3,637	50.75%	151	2.11%	59	0.82%	14	0.20%	-331	-4.62%	7,167
Benton	1,936	53.48%	1,566	43.26%	103	2.85%	15	0.41%	0	0.00%	370	10.22%	3,620
Blackford	1,835	43.10%	2,214	52.00%	166	3.90%	42	0.99%	1	0.02%	-379	-8.90%	4,258
Boone	3,471	48.22%	3,525	48.97%	166	2.31%	11	0.15%	25	0.35%	-54	-0.75%	7,198
Brown	663	34.60%	1,177	61.43%	68	3.55%	5	0.26%	3	0.16%	-514	-26.83%	1,916
Carroll	2,546	47.46%	2,590	48.28%	152	2.83%	68	1.27%	9	0.17%	-44	-0.82%	5,365
Cass	4,700	45.44%	5,234	50.60%	349	3.37%	38	0.37%	23	0.22%	-534	-5.16%	10,344
Clark	3,706	46.56%	4,085	51.33%	82	1.03%	68	0.85%	18	0.23%	-379	-4.76%	7,959
Clay	3,766	43.79%	4,204	48.88%	110	1.28%	499	5.80%	22	0.26%	-438	-5.09%	8,601
Clinton	3,626	47.20%	3,680	47.90%	281	3.66%	78	1.02%	17	0.22%	-54	-0.70%	7,682
Crawford	1,403	44.50%	1,539	48.81%	126	4.00%	82	2.60%	3	0.10%	-136	-4.31%	3,153
Daviess	3,424	48.38%	3,253	45.97%	134	1.89%	204	2.88%	62	0.88%	171	2.42%	7,077
De Kalb	2,991	42.41%	3,684	52.24%	287	4.07%	63	0.89%	27	0.38%	-693	-9.83%	7,052
Dearborn	2,520	41.81%	3,365	55.83%	94	1.56%	41	0.68%	7	0.12%	-845	-14.02%	6,027
Decatur	2,838	50.62%	2,564	45.73%	159	2.84%	39	0.70%	7	0.12%	274	4.89%	5,607
Delaware	7,014	51.29%	5,725	41.86%	475	3.47%	316	2.31%	146	1.07%	1,289	9.43%	13,676
Dubois	1,397	28.88%	3,344	69.12%	36	0.74%	58	1.20%	3	0.06%	-1,947	-40.24%	4,838
Elkhart	6,245	48.19%	5,697	43.96%	596	4.60%	400	3.09%	21	0.16%	548	4.23%	12,959
Fayette	2,394	55.77%	1,700	39.60%	114	2.66%	81	1.89%	4	0.09%	694	16.17%	4,293
Floyd	3,431	43.85%	4,064	51.94%	94	1.20%	226	2.89%	10	0.13%	-633	-8.09%	7,825
Fountain	2,894	48.90%	2,846	48.09%	122	2.06%	45	0.76%	11	0.19%	48	0.81%	5,918
Franklin	1,670	38.23%	2,616	59.89%	74	1.69%	7	0.16%	1	0.02%	-946	-21.66%	4,368
Fulton	2,426	49.34%	2,350	47.79%	125	2.54%	13	0.26%	3	0.06%	76	1.55%	4,917
Gibson	3,753	48.44%	3,656	47.19%	241	3.11%	86	1.11%	11	0.14%	97	1.25%	7,747
Grant	7,181	49.42%	5,819	40.05%	1,140	7.85%	339	2.33%	52	0.36%	1,362	9.37%	14,531
Greene	4,145	44.17%	4,172	44.45%	84	0.90%	930	9.91%	54	0.58%	-27	-0.29%	9,385
Hamilton	4,421	56.48%	2,947	37.65%	435	5.56%	24	0.31%	1	0.01%	1,474	18.83%	7,828
Hancock	2,472	43.50%	3,040	53.49%	146	2.57%	22	0.39%	3	0.05%	-568	-9.99%	5,683
Harrison	2,419	46.17%	2,646	50.51%	100	1.91%	67	1.28%	7	0.13%	-227	-4.33%	5,239
Hendricks	3,231	54.28%	2,571	43.19%	146	2.45%	0	0.00%	5	0.08%	660	11.09%	5,953
Henry	4,358	54.63%	3,197	40.07%	332	4.16%	61	0.76%	30	0.38%	1,161	14.55%	7,978
Howard	4,423	50.60%	3,497	40.01%	550	6.29%	255	2.92%	16	0.18%	926	10.59%	8,741
Huntington	3,973	47.62%	3,712	44.49%	405	4.85%	241	2.89%	13	0.16%	261	3.13%	8,344
Jackson	2,631	39.93%	3,783	57.41%	140	2.12%	30	0.46%	5	0.08%	-1,152	-17.48%	6,589
Jasper	1,939	55.19%	1,495	42.56%	70	1.99%	7	0.20%	2	0.06%	444	12.64%	3,513
Jay	3,256	45.75%	3,370	47.35%	426	5.99%	53	0.74%	12	0.17%	-114	-1.60%	7,117
Jefferson	2,995	50.06%	2,708	45.26%	176	2.94%	97	1.62%	7	0.12%	287	4.80%	5,983
Jennings	2,100	51.23%	1,871	45.65%	101	2.46%	21	0.51%	6	0.15%	229	5.59%	4,099
Johnson	2,519	42.04%	3,268	54.54%	193	3.22%	9	0.15%	3	0.05%	-749	-12.50%	5,992
Knox	4,247	42.53%	5,116	51.24%	199	1.99%	375	3.76%	48	0.48%	-869	-8.70%	9,985
Kosciusko	4,377	54.45%	3,362	41.82%	233	2.90%	54	0.67%	13	0.16%	1,015	12.63%	8,039
La Porte	5,824	49.52%	5,680	48.30%	126	1.07%	103	0.88%	27	0.23%	144	1.22%	11,760
Lagrange	2,357	60.13%	1,414	36.07%	133	3.39%	10	0.26%	6	0.15%	943	24.06%	3,920
Lake	9,499	60.97%	5,502	35.32%	125	0.80%	303	1.94%	150	0.96%	3,997	25.66%	15,579
Lawrence	3,884	53.77%	3,118	43.16%	93	1.29%	119	1.65%	10	0.14%	766	10.60%	7,224
Madison	7,481	43.48%	8,296	48.22%	497	2.89%	894	5.20%	36	0.21%	-815	-4.74%	17,204
Marion	34,351	48.67%	34,078	48.28%	839	1.19%	1,075	1.52%	237	0.34%	273	0.39%	70,580
Marshall	2,947	45.31%	3,287	50.54%	199	3.06%	55	0.85%	16	0.25%	-340	-5.23%	6,504
Martin	1,667	48.35%	1,733	50.26%	34	0.99%	11	0.32%	3	0.09%	-66	-1.91%	3,448
Miami	3,820	45.26%	4,176	49.48%	233	2.76%	187	2.22%	24	0.28%	-356	-4.22%	8,440
Monroe	3,051	51.48%	2,780	46.91%	77	1.30%	14	0.24%	4	0.07%	271	4.57%	5,926
Montgomery	4,427	49.64%	4,227	47.39%	195	2.19%	44	0.49%	26	0.29%	200	2.24%	8,919
Morgan	3,074	50.98%	2,789	46.25%	121	2.01%	44	0.73%	2	0.03%	285	4.73%	6,030
Newton	1,645	56.47%	1,190	40.85%	65	2.23%	8	0.27%	5	0.17%	455	15.62%	2,913
Noble	3,507	50.72%	3,249	46.99%	120	1.74%	29	0.42%	9	0.13%	258	3.73%	6,914
Ohio	619	49.13%	622	49.37%	16	1.27%	3	0.24%	0	0.00%	-3	-0.24%	1,260
Orange	2,433	53.92%	1,961	43.46%	70	1.55%	44	0.98%	4	0.09%	472	10.46%	4,512
Owen	1,726	44.53%	2,023	52.19%	61	1.57%	51	1.32%	15	0.39%	-297	-7.66%	3,876
Parke	3,026	48.35%	2,707	43.25%	315	5.03%	204	3.26%	7	0.11%	319	5.10%	6,259
Perry	1,903	43.93%	2,356	54.39%	34	0.78%	37	0.85%	2	0.05%	-453	-10.46%	4,332
Pike	2,359	47.88%	2,360	47.90%	59	1.20%	131	2.66%	18	0.37%	-1	-0.02%	4,927
Porter	2,940	59.88%	1,789	36.44%	78	1.59%	59	1.20%	44	0.90%	1,151	23.44%	4,910
Posey	2,444	42.49%	3,084	53.62%	147	2.56%	69	1.20%	8	0.14%	-640	-11.13%	5,752
Pulaski	1,561	44.31%	1,832	52.00%	101	2.87%	14	0.40%	15	0.42%	-271	-7.69%	3,523
Putnam	2,626	44.31%	3,131	52.83%	121	2.04%	36	0.61%	12	0.20%	-505	-8.52%	5,926
Randolph	4,792	60.90%	2,600	33.05%	380	4.83%	87	1.11%	9	0.11%	2,192	27.86%	7,868
Ripley	2,660	47.65%	2,749	49.25%	88	1.58%	76	1.36%	9	0.16%	-89	-1.59%	5,582
Rush	3,102	52.96%	2,544	43.44%	191	3.26%	13	0.22%	7	0.12%	558	9.53%	5,857
Scott	979	42.96%	1,243	54.54%	51	2.24%	3	0.13%	3	0.13%	-264	-11.58%	2,279
Shelby	3,529	44.54%	4,035	50.93%	252	3.18%	95	1.20%	12	0.15%	-506	-6.39%	7,923
Spencer	2,920	51.54%	2,662	46.98%	61	1.08%	18	0.32%	5	0.09%	258	4.55%	5,666
St. Joseph	11,222	53.92%	8,562	41.14%	272	1.31%	705	3.39%	52	0.25%	2,660	12.78%	20,813
Starke	1,521	52.18%	1,305	44.77%	43	1.48%	39	1.34%	7	0.24%	216	7.41%	2,915
Steuben	2,704	62.00%	1,453	33.32%	182	4.17%	13	0.30%	9	0.21%	1,251	28.69%	4,361
Sullivan	2,942	35.67%	4,657	56.46%	225	2.73%	398	4.83%	26	0.32%	-1,715	-20.79%	8,248
Switzerland	1,444	47.27%	1,537	50.31%	58	1.90%	14	0.46%	2	0.07%	-93	-3.04%	3,055
Tippecanoe	6,164	53.42%	4,984	43.19%	289	2.50%	65	0.56%	37	0.32%	1,180	10.23%	11,539
Tipton	2,395	46.45%	2,556	49.57%	183	3.55%	13	0.25%	9	0.17%	-161	-3.12%	5,156
Union	1,066	54.25%	808	41.12%	73	3.72%	18	0.92%	0	0.00%	258	13.13%	1,965
Vanderburgh	9,116	49.43%	8,033	43.56%	135	0.73%	1,034	5.61%	125	0.68%	1,083	5.87%	18,443
Vermillion	2,568	50.83%	1,844	36.50%	217	4.30%	407	8.06%	16	0.32%	724	14.33%	5,052
Vigo	10,223	45.76%	10,685	47.82%	257	1.15%	690	3.09%	487	2.18%	-462	-2.07%	22,342
Wabash	4,091	53.55%	3,116	40.79%	337	4.41%	87	1.14%	9	0.12%	975	12.76%	7,640
Warren	2,092	65.09%	1,045	32.51%	70	2.18%	3	0.09%	4	0.12%	1,047	32.58%	3,214
Warrick	2,839	48.37%	2,782	47.40%	138	2.35%	101	1.72%	9	0.15%	57	0.97%	5,869
Washington	1,976	42.58%	2,573	55.44%	74	1.59%	12	0.26%	6	0.13%	-597	-12.86%	4,641
Wayne	6,731	57.34%	4,503	38.36%	179	1.52%	308	2.62%	17	0.14%	2,228	18.98%	11,738
Wells	2,185	35.92%	3,345	54.99%	482	7.92%	65	1.07%	6	0.10%	-1,160	-19.07%	6,083
White	2,423	49.26%	2,326	47.29%	144	2.93%	19	0.39%	7	0.14%	97	1.97%	4,919
Whitley	2,302	46.57%	2,493	50.43%	134	2.71%	13	0.26%	1	0.02%	-191	-3.86%	4,943
TOTAL	348,993	48.40%	338,262	46.91%	18,036	2.50%	13,476	1.87%	2,350	0.32%	10,731	1.49%	721,117

== See also ==
- United States presidential elections in Indiana

== Bibliography ==
- Indiana (1908). Election Law of Indiana. Indianapolis: State Board of Election Commissioners.
- Madison, James H. (1986). The Indiana Way: A State History. Bloomington: Indiana University Press.
- Phillips, Kevin P. (1969). The Emerging Republican Majority. New Rochelle, NY: Arlington House. LCCN 76-79602.
- Petersen, Svend (1963). A Statistical History of the American Presidential Elections. New York: Frederick Ungar Publishing Company. LCCN 62-21786.
- Sims, Fred A. (1908). Biennial Report of Fred A. Sims, Secretary of State of the State of Indiana [...]. Indianapolis.
