= Vigo County, Indiana =

County in Indiana, United States

- County
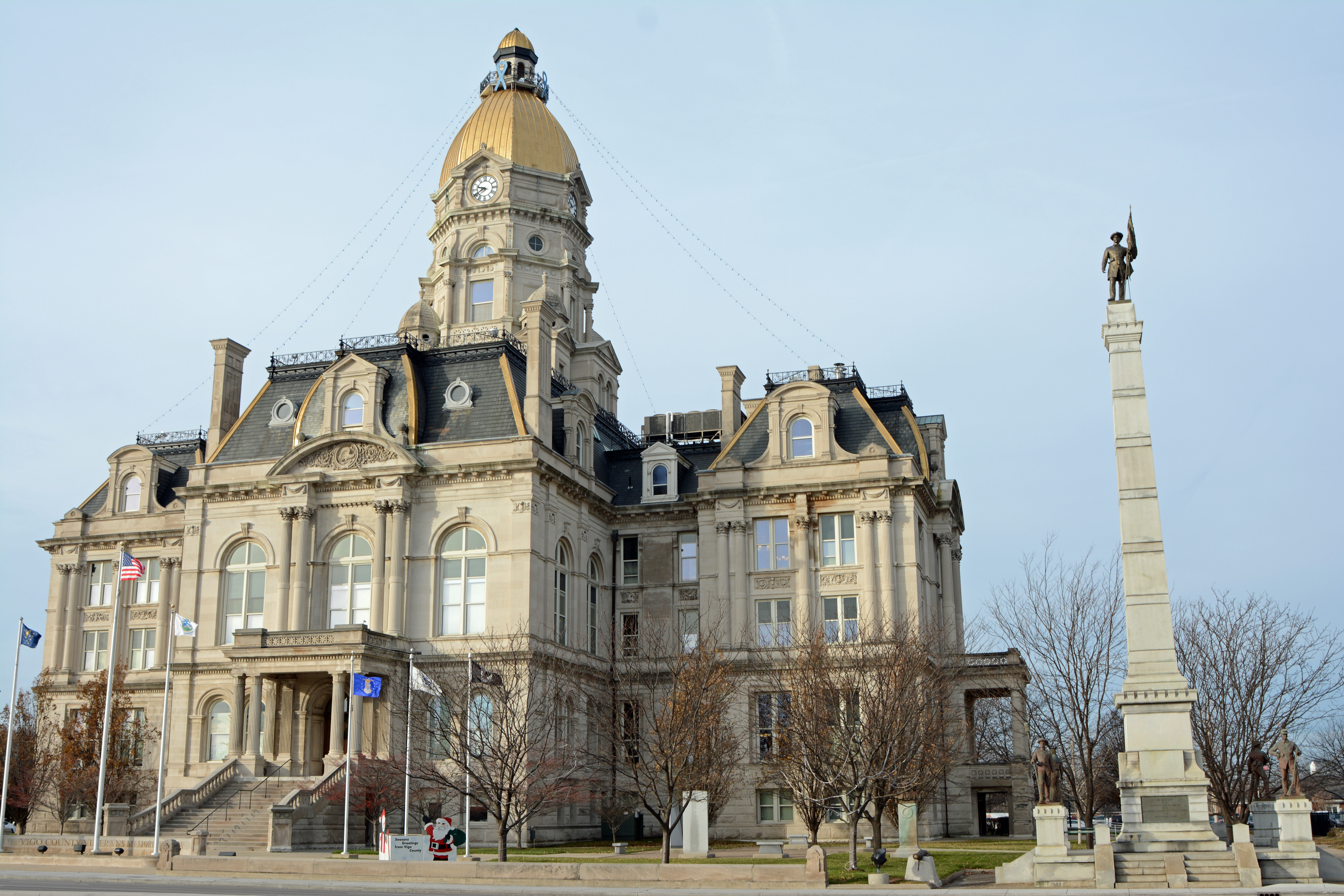
- Vigo County Courthouse in Terre Haute

- Seal

- Location within the U.S. state of Indiana
- Coordinates: 39°26′N 87°23′W
- Country: United States
- State: Indiana
- Founded: February 1, 1818
- Named for: Francis Vigo
- Seat: Terre Haute
- Largest city: Terre Haute

Area
  - Total: 410.45 sq mi (1,063.1 km^{2})
  - Land: 403.31 sq mi (1,044.6 km^{2})
  - Water: 7.14 sq mi (18.5 km^{2}) 1.74%

Population (2020)
  - Total: 106,153
  - Estimate (2025): 106,512 ▲
  - Density: 263/sq mi (102/km^{2})
- Time zone: UTC−5 (Eastern)
  - Summer (DST): UTC−4 (EDT)
- Congressional district: 8th
- Website: www.vigocounty.in.gov
- Indiana county number 84

Vigo County (/ˈviːɡoʊ/ VEE-goh) is a county on the western border of the U.S. state of Indiana. The county is included in the Terre Haute metropolitan area. According to the 2020 United States census, it has a population of 106,153. Its county seat is Terre Haute.

The county contains four incorporated settlements with a total population of nearly 63,000, as well as several unincorporated communities. It is divided into twelve townships which provide local services to the residents.

The county was once regarded as one of the best bellwether regions for voting in U.S. presidential elections; it voted for the winning candidate in every election from 1956 to 2016 and in all but three elections since 1888. Until the streak ended in 2020, only one county in the United States, Valencia County, New Mexico, had voted for the winning candidate longer.

== History ==
In 1787, the fledgling United States defined the Northwest Territory, which included the area of present-day Indiana. In 1800, Congress separated Ohio from the Northwest Territory, designating the rest of the land as the Indiana Territory. President Thomas Jefferson chose William Henry Harrison as the territory's first governor, and Vincennes was established as the territorial capital. After the Michigan Territory was separated and the Illinois Territory was formed, Indiana was reduced to its current size and geography. By December 1816 the Indiana Territory was admitted to the Union as a state.

Starting in 1794, Native American titles to Indiana lands were extinguished by usurpation, purchase, or war and treaty. The United States acquired land from the Native Americans in the 1809 treaty of Fort Wayne, and by the treaty of St. Mary's in 1818 considerably more territory became property of the government. These two treaties resolved the occupation issue for the future Vigo County. Whites had been living in the area since 1811, when General Harrison erected a fort north of present-day Terre Haute. After the Indian skirmishes were resolved, settlers arrived in significant numbers beginning 1815.

The area in present-day Vigo County was first placed under local jurisdiction in 1790, when Knox County was created. This all-encompassing county was repeatedly subdivided as its lands were occupied. On December 30, 1816, a portion was partitioned to create Sullivan County, and on January 21, 1818, the northern portion of Sullivan was partitioned off to create Vigo County. The first county commissioners organized the government in 1818, including naming Terre Haute as its seat. The county's borders changed several times; in 1821, part of the county was formed into Parke County, and later that year Putnam County was formed which also affected Vigo's borders. The final change came in 1873 when the present boundaries were defined. The county is named for Colonel Francis Vigo, of Italian heritage but a citizen of Spain due to residence in St. Louis. He is credited with assisting George Rogers Clark, both in financing Clark's exploration and American Revolutionary War efforts, and in service as an agent obtaining military information for Clark against British campaigns on the then frontier.

== Geography ==
Map of Vigo County

To the north of Vigo County, the Wabash River defines the boundary between Vermillion and Parke counties; the river then enters Vigo County and winds to the south-southwest, defining the southern portion of the county's western border with Illinois before continuing south along Sullivan County's western border. Vigo County is thus the southernmost county in Indiana on the right bank of the Wabash. The county's low hills are devoted to agriculture or urban development; only the drainages and river-adjacent areas are still wooded. Its highest point (680 feet (210 meters) ASL) is Sanford Hill, one mile (1.6 km) west of Paint Mill Lake, south of Terre Haute.

According to the 2010 census, the county has a total area of 410.45 square miles (1,063.1 km^{2}), of which 403.31 square miles (1,044.6 km^{2}) (or 98.26%) is land and 7.14 square miles (18.5 km^{2}) (or 1.74%) is water.

=== Adjacent counties ===
- Vermillion County - north
- Parke County - northeast
- Clay County - east
- Sullivan County - south
- Clark County, Illinois - southwest
- Edgar County, Illinois - northwest

=== Cities ===
- Terre Haute (county seat)

=== Towns ===
- West Terre Haute
- Seelyville
- Riley (or Lockport)

=== Census-designated places ===
- Dresser (or Taylorville)
- Fontanet
- New Goshen
- North Terre Haute
- St. Mary-of-the-Woods
- Shepardsville
- Tecumseh
- Toad Hop

==== Unincorporated communities ====
- Allendale
- Atherton
- Barnhart Town
- Blackhawk
- Burnett
- Cherryvale
- Coal Bluff
- Cobb
- Dewey
- Duane Yards
- East Glenn
- Ehrmandale
- Ferguson Hill
- Glenn Ayr
- Gospel Grove
- Grange Corner
- Harrison
- Hickory Island
- Hutton
- Keller
- Larimer Hill
- Lewis
- Libertyville
- Liggett
- Marion Heights
- Markles
- Otter Creek Junction
- Parkview
- Pimento
- Pine Ridge
- Prairie Creek
- Prairieton
- Preston
- Sandcut
- Sandford
- Shirkieville
- Southwood
- Spelterville
- Spring Hill
- State Line
- Swalls
- Tabertown
- Terre Town
- Twelve Points
- Vigo
- West New Goshen
- Whitcomb Heights
- Woodgate
- Youngstown

=== Townships ===
The year after it was authorized, Vigo County was divided into four townships: Honey Creek Wabash, Harrison, and Independence. Prairie Creek Township was formed later that year. Otter Creek, Raccoon, and Sugar Creek townships were created in 1820, and Independence Township was renamed as Paris Township. Raccoon and Wabash townships became part of Parke County when it was partitioned from Vigo County in 1821. Nevins and Riley townships were formed in 1822. In 1824, Paris Township was renamed again to Fayette Township. Pierson Township was created in 1829; Lost Creek in 1831; Linton in 1841; and Prairieton Township in 1857.

- Fayette Township
- Harrison Township
- Honey Creek Township
- Linton Township
- Lost Creek Township
- Nevins Township
- Otter Creek Township
- Pierson Township
- Prairie Creek Township
- Prairieton Township
- Riley Township
- Sugar Creek Township

=== Highways ===
Interstate 70 passes through the southern part of Terre Haute from east to west on its way from Indianapolis to Saint Louis, Missouri; U.S. Route 40 roughly parallels Interstate 70 and passes through the middle of the city. Both highways intersect U.S. Route 41, coming from Chicago to the north; U.S. Route 150 enters from Paris, Illinois to the northwest and joins U.S. Route 41 in downtown Terre Haute, and both continue south toward Vincennes and Evansville.

- State Road 42
- State Road 46
- State Road 63
- State Road 159
- State Road 246
- State Road 340
- State Road 641

=== Rail ===
Several CSX Transportation railroad lines meet in Terre Haute; one enters from the north, another from the Indianapolis area, and another from Vincennes; and two others enter from Illinois. An Indiana Rail Road line runs southeast from Terre Haute toward Bedford.

=== Airports ===
The following public-use airports are located in the county:

- Terre Haute Regional Airport (HUF) in Terre Haute
- Sky King Airport (3I3) in North Terre Haute

== Education ==
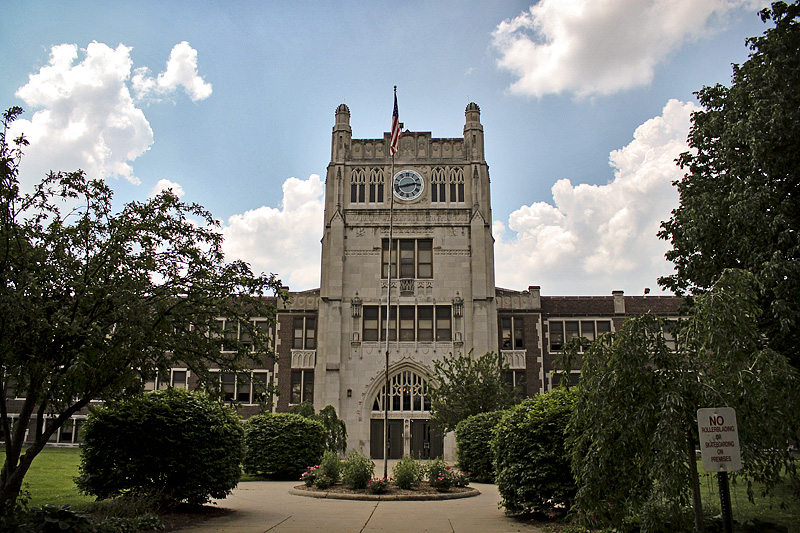
Woodrow Wilson School in Terre Haute

The public schools in the county are part of the Vigo County School Corporation. All parts of the county are in this school district. During the 2009–10 school year, the schools served a total of 16,014 students.

Vigo County is served by the Vigo County Public Library.

Colleges in Vigo County include Indiana State University and Rose-Hulman Institute of Technology. For a fuller list, see the List of schools in metropolitan Terre Haute.

== Climate and weather ==
Terre Haute, Indiana

Climate chart (precipitation, max. and min. temperature)
J	F	M	A	M	J	J	A	S	O	N	D
2.1 35 18	2.6 41 22	3.7 52 33	4.1 64 42	4.5 75 52	4.1 84 61	4.5 87 65	3.7 85 63	3.4 79 55	3 68 44	3.8 53 34	3 41 23
- █ Average max. and min. temperatures in °F
- █ Precipitation totals in inches
- Source: The Weather Channel
Metric conversion
J	F	M	A	M	J	J	A	S	O	N	D
54 2 −8	66 5 −6	93 11 1	105 18 6	113 24 11	104 29 16	113 31 18	95 29 17	86 26 13	76 20 7	97 12 1	76 5 −5
- █ Average max. and min. temperatures in °C
- █ Precipitation totals in mm

In recent years, average temperatures in Terre Haute have ranged from a low of 18 °F (−8 °C) in January to a high of 87 °F (31 °C) in July, although a record low of −24 °F (−31 °C) was recorded in January 1977 and a record high of 104 °F (40 °C) was recorded in September 1954. Average monthly precipitation ranged from 2.13 inches (54 mm) in January to 4.46 inches (113 mm) in May.

== Government ==
The county government is a constitutional body, and is granted specific powers by the Constitution of Indiana, and by the Indiana Code. The county council is the fiscal body of the county government and controls spending and revenue collection in the county. Representatives, elected to four-year terms from county districts, are responsible for setting salaries, the annual budget, and special spending. The council has limited authority to impose local taxes, in the form of an income and property tax that is subject to state level approval, excise taxes, and service taxes.

A board of commissioners is the executive and legislative body of the county. Commissioners are elected county-wide to staggered four-year terms. One commissioner serves as president. The commissioners execute the acts of the county council, and manage the county government.

The county maintains a small claims court that handles civil cases. The judge on the court is elected to a term of four years and must be a member of the Indiana Bar Association. The judge is assisted by a constable who is also elected to a four-year term. In some cases, court decisions can be appealed to the state level circuit court.

The county has other elected offices, including sheriff, coroner, auditor, treasurer, recorder, surveyor, and circuit court clerk. These officers are elected to four-year terms. Members elected to county government positions are required to declare party affiliations and to be residents of the county.

=== Politics ===
United States presidential election results for Vigo County, Indiana
Year	Republican		Democratic		Third party(ies)	
Year	No.	%	No.	%	No.	%
1888	6,273	49.84%	6,102	48.48%	212	1.68%
1892	6,159	47.64%	6,599	51.04%	170	1.31%
1896	8,020	51.17%	7,558	48.23%	94	0.60%
1900	7,992	49.88%	7,472	46.63%	559	3.49%
1904	10,327	56.33%	6,625	36.14%	1,380	7.53%
1908	10,223	45.76%	10,685	47.82%	1,434	6.42%
1912	3,103	17.18%	7,256	40.18%	7,701	42.64%
1916	8,934	39.71%	11,165	49.63%	2,397	10.66%
1920	18,668	50.30%	15,739	42.41%	2,707	7.29%
1924	19,545	52.74%	12,999	35.08%	4,515	12.18%
1928	22,962	54.71%	18,509	44.10%	497	1.18%
1932	18,310	40.52%	25,886	57.29%	991	2.19%
1936	17,278	34.05%	33,018	65.08%	442	0.87%
1940	23,177	43.99%	29,308	55.63%	199	0.38%
1944	21,493	46.50%	24,649	53.33%	81	0.18%
1948	19,049	41.81%	25,906	56.86%	609	1.34%
1952	25,806	49.74%	25,841	49.81%	231	0.45%
1956	25,253	50.44%	24,680	49.29%	135	0.27%
1960	24,940	49.70%	25,105	50.03%	133	0.27%
1964	19,001	40.64%	27,606	59.05%	144	0.31%
1968	20,814	44.60%	20,328	43.56%	5,522	11.83%
1972	29,730	60.73%	18,898	38.60%	329	0.67%
1976	23,555	48.46%	24,684	50.78%	371	0.76%
1980	24,133	51.87%	19,261	41.40%	3,133	6.73%
1984	26,259	58.39%	18,429	40.98%	285	0.63%
1988	21,929	53.11%	19,192	46.48%	172	0.42%
1992	15,834	37.56%	18,050	42.81%	8,277	19.63%
1996	15,751	40.91%	17,974	46.69%	4,774	12.40%
2000	18,021	49.74%	17,570	48.50%	637	1.76%
2004	20,988	52.81%	18,426	46.36%	330	0.83%
2008	18,121	41.29%	25,040	57.06%	723	1.65%
2012	19,369	48.42%	19,712	49.27%	924	2.31%
2016	21,937	54.67%	15,931	39.70%	2,259	5.63%
2020	24,545	56.17%	18,123	41.47%	1,030	2.36%
2024	23,738	57.87%	16,338	39.83%	947	2.31%

The county was regarded as one of the best bellwether regions in U.S. presidential elections. Between 1888 and 2016, it voted for the winning candidate in every election in all but two instances: 1908 and 1952. In 2020, its bellwether status came to an end when national winner Joe Biden lost the county by nearly 15 points to Donald Trump.

In 2008 and 2012, Democratic candidate Barack Obama carried Vigo County twice. After 2012, political realignment and shift of white working-class voters to Trump, exodus of young people to cities and the rightward turn of exurban areas accelerated by the Trump era have caused Vigo County to become Republican-leaning.

The results in the county have often mirrored the nationwide popular vote. In every presidential election from 1960 to 2004, the county voted less than five percentage points from the national result. In 2024, Donald Trump received 58 percent of the vote, which was the best result for a Republican since Ronald Reagan in 1984, who received 58.4 percent of the vote.

Vigo is part of Indiana's 8th congressional district, which is held by Republican Mark Messmer.

== Demographics ==
Historical population
Census	Pop.	Note	%±
1820	3,390		—
1830	5,766		70.1%
1840	12,076		109.4%
1850	15,289		26.6%
1860	22,517		47.3%
1870	33,549		49.0%
1880	45,658		36.1%
1890	50,195		9.9%
1900	62,035		23.6%
1910	87,930		41.7%
1920	100,212		14.0%
1930	98,861		−1.3%
1940	99,709		0.9%
1950	105,160		5.5%
1960	108,458		3.1%
1970	114,528		5.6%
1980	112,385		−1.9%
1990	106,107		−5.6%
2000	105,848		−0.2%
2010	107,848		1.9%
2020	106,153		−1.6%
2025 (est.)	106,512	▲	0.3%
US Decennial Census

=== Racial and ethnic composition ===
Vigo County, Indiana – Racial and ethnic composition Note: the US Census treats Hispanic/Latino as an ethnic category. This table excludes Latinos from the racial categories and assigns them to a separate category. Hispanics/Latinos may be of any race.
Race / Ethnicity (NH = Non-Hispanic)	Pop 1980	Pop 1990	Pop 2000	Pop 2010	Pop 2020	% 1980	% 1990	% 2000	% 2010	% 2020
White alone (NH)	104,245	97,818	95,184	93,550	88,137	92.76%	92.19%	89.93%	86.74%	83.03%
Black or African American alone (NH)	6,148	5,792	6,334	7,371	7,079	5.47%	5.46%	5.98%	6.83%	6.67%
Native American or Alaska Native alone (NH)	192	277	275	321	311	0.17%	0.26%	0.26%	0.30%	0.29%
Asian alone (NH)	615	1,155	1,288	1,777	2,003	0.55%	1.09%	1.22%	1.65%	1.89%
Native Hawaiian or Pacific Islander alone (NH)	x	x	34	32	25	x	x	0.03%	0.03%	0.02%
Other race alone (NH)	323	68	133	148	616	0.29%	0.06%	0.13%	0.14%	0.58%
Mixed race or Multiracial (NH)	x	x	1,325	2,180	4,743	x	x	1.25%	2.02%	4.47%
Hispanic or Latino (any race)	862	997	1,275	2,469	3,239	0.77%	0.94%	1.20%	2.29%	3.05%
Total	112,385	106,107	105,848	107,848	106,153	100.00%	100.00%	100.00%	100.00%	100.00%

=== 2020 census ===
As of the 2020 census, the county had a population of 106,153. The median age was 37.4 years. 20.4% of residents were under the age of 18 and 17.1% of residents were 65 years of age or older. For every 100 females there were 100.5 males, and for every 100 females age 18 and over there were 99.6 males age 18 and over.

The racial makeup of the county was 84.2% White, 6.8% Black or African American, 0.3% American Indian and Alaska Native, 1.9% Asian, <0.1% Native Hawaiian and Pacific Islander, 1.4% from some other race, and 5.3% from two or more races. Hispanic or Latino residents of any race comprised 3.1% of the population.

75.2% of residents lived in urban areas, while 24.8% lived in rural areas.

There were 41,849 households in the county, of which 27.3% had children under the age of 18 living in them. Of all households, 40.6% were married-couple households, 21.3% were households with a male householder and no spouse or partner present, and 29.6% were households with a female householder and no spouse or partner present. About 32.9% of all households were made up of individuals and 13.1% had someone living alone who was 65 years of age or older.

There were 46,932 housing units, of which 10.8% were vacant. Among occupied housing units, 61.7% were owner-occupied and 38.3% were renter-occupied. The homeowner vacancy rate was 1.9% and the rental vacancy rate was 12.0%.

=== 2010 census ===
As of the 2010 United States census, there were 107,848 people, 41,361 households, and 25,607 families in the county. The population density was 267.4 inhabitants per square mile (103.2/km^{2}). There were 46,006 housing units at an average density of 114.1 per square mile (44.1/km^{2}). The racial makeup of the county was 88.3% white, 6.9% black or African American, 1.7% Asian, 0.3% American Indian, 0.6% from other races, and 2.2% from two or more races. Those of Hispanic or Latino origin made up 2.3% of the population. In terms of ancestry, 22.6% were German, 20.2% were American, 12.2% were Irish, and 10.3% were English.

Of the 41,361 households, 30.2% had children under the age of 18 living with them, 43.9% were married couples living together, 13.1% had a female householder with no husband present, 38.1% were non-families, and 30.6% of all households were made up of individuals. The average household size was 2.38 and the average family size was 2.95. The median age was 36.1 years.

The median income for a household in the county was $47,697 and the median income for a family was $50,413. Males had a median income of $42,014 versus $30,217 for females. The per capita income for the county was $20,398. About 13.3% of families and 19.5% of the population were below the poverty line, including 27.5% of those under age 18 and 9.5% of those age 65 or over.

== See also ==
- List of public art in Vigo County, Indiana
- National Register of Historic Places listings in Vigo County, Indiana
- Vigo County Courthouse
