= Vigo, Indiana =

- Unincorporated community
- Vigo County's location in Indiana

- Location in Vigo County, Indiana
- Coordinates: 39°17′14″N 87°32′14″W
- Country: United States
- State: Indiana
- County: Vigo
- Township: Prairie Creek
- Elevation: 456 ft (139 m)
- Time zone: UTC-5 (Eastern (EST))
  - Summer (DST): UTC-4 (EDT)
- ZIP code: 47802
- Area codes: 812, 930
- GNIS feature ID: 445288

Vigo is a small unincorporated community in Prairie Creek Township, Vigo County, in the U.S. state of Indiana. The community is in the 47802 zip code, the Wabash Valley and the Terre Haute Metropolitan Statistical Area.

== History ==
A post office was established at Vigo in 1844, and remained in operation until it was discontinued in 1905.

== Geography ==
Vigo is located at 39°17′14″N 87°32′14″W, about 6 miles (9.7 km) southwest of Terre Haute, the county seat.
