= Dennison, Illinois =

Dennison
- Unincorporated community
- Location of Dennison within Illinois Dennison (the United States)
- Coordinates: 39°27′39″N 87°35′52″W
- Country: United States
- State: Illinois
- County: Clark
- Elevation: 577 ft (176 m)
- Time zone: UTC-6 (CST)
  - Summer (DST): UTC-5 (CDT)
- Postal code: 62423
- GNIS feature ID: 407130

Dennison is an unincorporated community in Wabash Township in the northeast corner of Clark County, Illinois, east of Illinois Route 1 and north of Interstate 70.

== Geography ==
Dennison is located at 39°27'39" North, 87°35'52" West (39.4608688, -87.5978025).
