= Vigo County Courthouse =

Historical courthouse in Terre Haute, United States

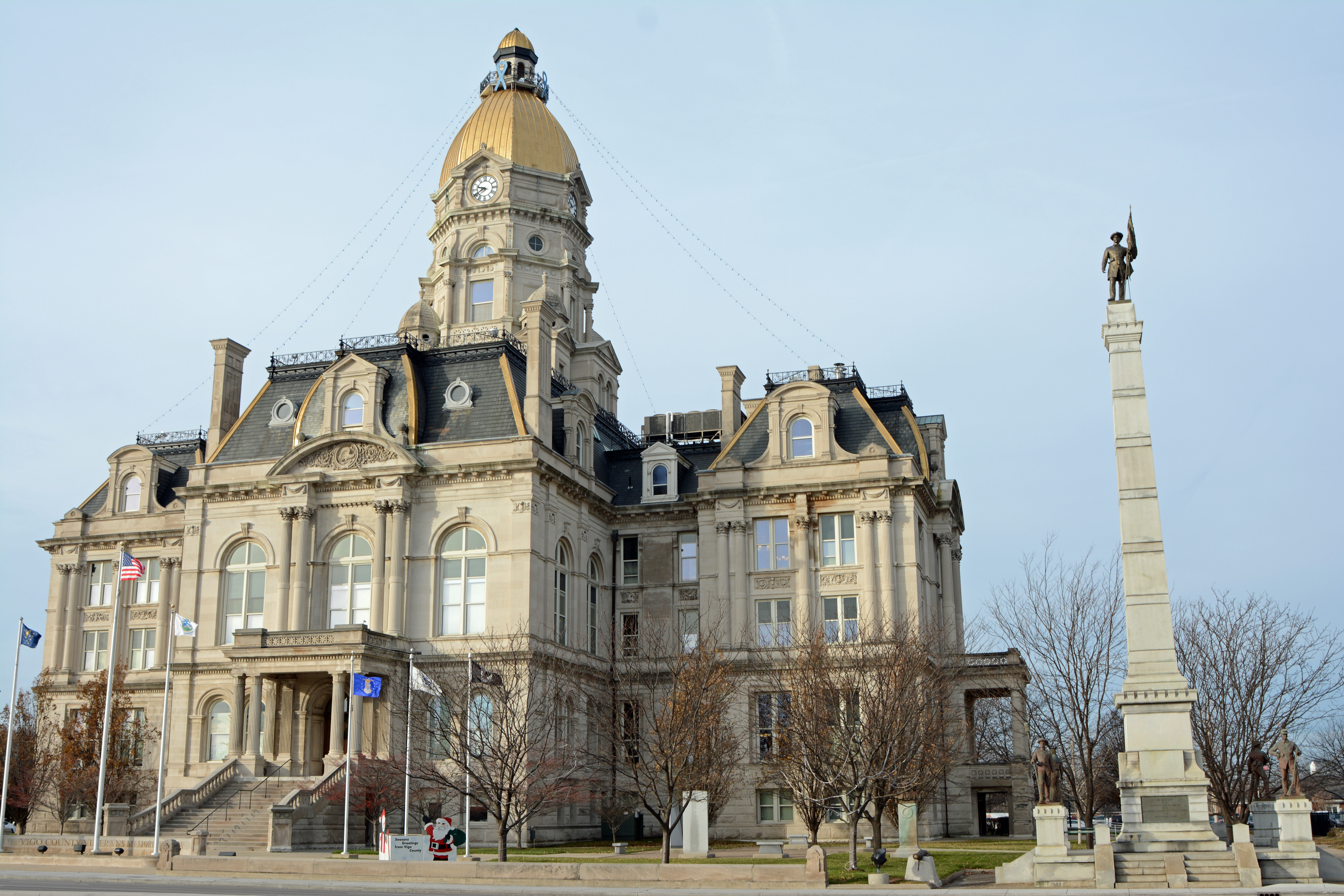

- Location within Vigo County, Indiana Location within Indiana Location within the United States

General information
- Architectural style: Second Empire
- Location: 33 So.3rd St, Terre Haute, Indiana, United States
- Coordinates: 39°27′57″N 87°24′52″W
- Elevation: 506 feet above sea level
- Construction started: August 1884
- Completed: 1888
- Inaugurated: June 7, 1888
- Cost: $443,000 at original completion
- Owner: Vigo County, Indiana

Height
- Height: 284 ft (87 m)

Dimensions
- Diameter: 226 ft (69 m)

Design and construction
- Architect: Samuel Hannaford
- Vigo County Courthouse
- U.S. National Register of Historic Places
- Area: 74,515 square feet
- NRHP reference No.: 83000160
- Added to NRHP: June 30, 1983
- Main contractor: Terre Haute Stone Co.

The Vigo County Courthouse is a courthouse in Terre Haute, Indiana. The seat of government for Vigo County, the courthouse was placed on the National Register of Historic Places in 1983.

== Original courthouse ==
=== Temporary meeting place ===
Vigo County was formed in 1818 by the Indiana General Assembly and construction of the county's first courthouse began that year. In the meantime, the temporary courthouse was the Eagle and Lion Tavern on the corner of Wabash Avenue and Second Street.

=== Construction ===
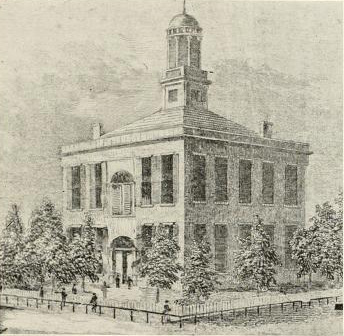
The original Vigo County Courthouse, 1818-1866.

Early records show that on May 13, 1818, Nathaniel P. Huntington was allowed $10 for drawing up bonds; John M. Coleman $350 in part pay for building foundations; William Durham $400 in part pay for building walls, and Elihu Hovey and John Brocklebank $300 in part pay for building Court House. In November 1818, public records show that Charles B. Modesitt was allowed $25 for "clearing off the public square," indicating that the work of building the Court House began in 1818, though the structure was not completed until 1822.

This original structure was brick with a broad arched transom and an interior with elevated box seats and steps. A center aisle ran through the center of the building, dividing the structure into a south side dedicated to seating and a north side for the express use of the court and room for a judge's bench, lawyers' tables and a jury box.

=== Community importance ===
The bottom floor of the courthouse was completed in 1822 and quickly became the place for court business, political gatherings, elections, public town meetings, lectures, sermons and more. Sometime in 1834–35, Joseph Smith and Sidney Rigdon held meetings there defending the fledgling Latter Day Saint movement. In the 1850s, George W. Julian delivered an Abolition speech in the courthouse, where an angry mob gathered to prevent him from speaking but eventually departed.

Numerous notable lawyers from the region began their careers at the first Vigo County Courthouse, including Thomas H. Blake, James Whitcomb, Elisha Mills Huntington and Edward A. Hannegan.

=== Colonel Francis Vigo ===
On July 4, 1832, Colonel Francis Vigo, the county's namesake, traveled from his home in Vincennes, Indiana, to visit Terre Haute and the urging of some of its prominent citizens. Impressed by the city, Vigo remembered the courthouse in his will (dated December 9, 1834) by a gift of $500 to Vigo County to be used "in the purchase of a bell for the courthouse of said county, on which will be inscribed 'Presented by Francis Vigo.'"

=== Need for a new courthouse ===
This structure served until 1866. In 1868, the structure was declared unfit for use. A temporary courthouse was established in a four-story brick building on the corner of Third and Ohio streets until a more permanent structure could be built. It was assumed that the original courthouse would be fixed and return to use, but this never occurred, and the temporary structure ended up being used for 22 years. The building of a new courthouse was stalled in part by squabbling among the city council and a special election in May 1871 in which the vote was 450 for and nearly 4,000 against the project, where it was then ordered that no new courthouse be built at that time.

== Second courthouse ==
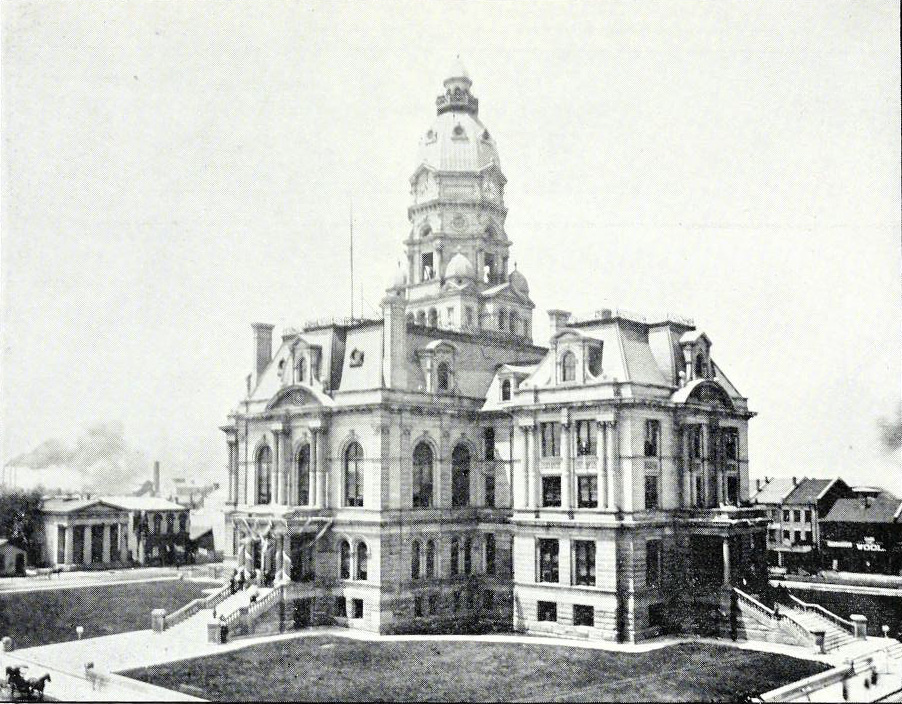
The Vigo County Courthouse, circa 1894.

The second courthouse is a Second Empire-style structure designed by Cincinnati architect Samuel Hannaford.

=== Construction ===
Work began on the current structure when a 10,000-pound cornerstone was laid on August 28, 1884, with ceremonies sponsored by the Freemasons with a principal address by the Honorable D. W. Voorhees. This event was attended by many from the surrounding country as well as adjacent towns in Illinois.

Designed by Cincinnati architect Samuel Hannaford, the building was constructed by the Terre Haute Stone Company at a cost of $443,000. The courthouse is made from Indiana limestone gathered from Stinesville, Indiana quarries. Cast-iron work in the roof and dome as well as windows and cresting were completed by Phoenix Foundry and Machine Works.

Originally, the main floor consisted of offices, with two large, high-ceiling courtrooms on the second floor. Elegantly finished and furnished, the courthouse was heated with steam from a detached building to the south and featured a hydraulic elevator.

In accordance with the will of Francis Vigo, the courthouse features a two-ton bell made in 1887. The bell was bought for $2,500, partially funded by the money left in Vigo's will.

The courthouse was dedicated on June 7, 1888.

The courthouse is of similar style to the Vanderburgh County Courthouse.

It was listed on the National Register of Historic Places in 1983.

== Gallery ==
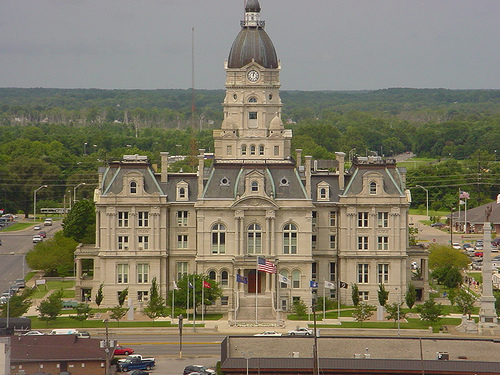
View from the east

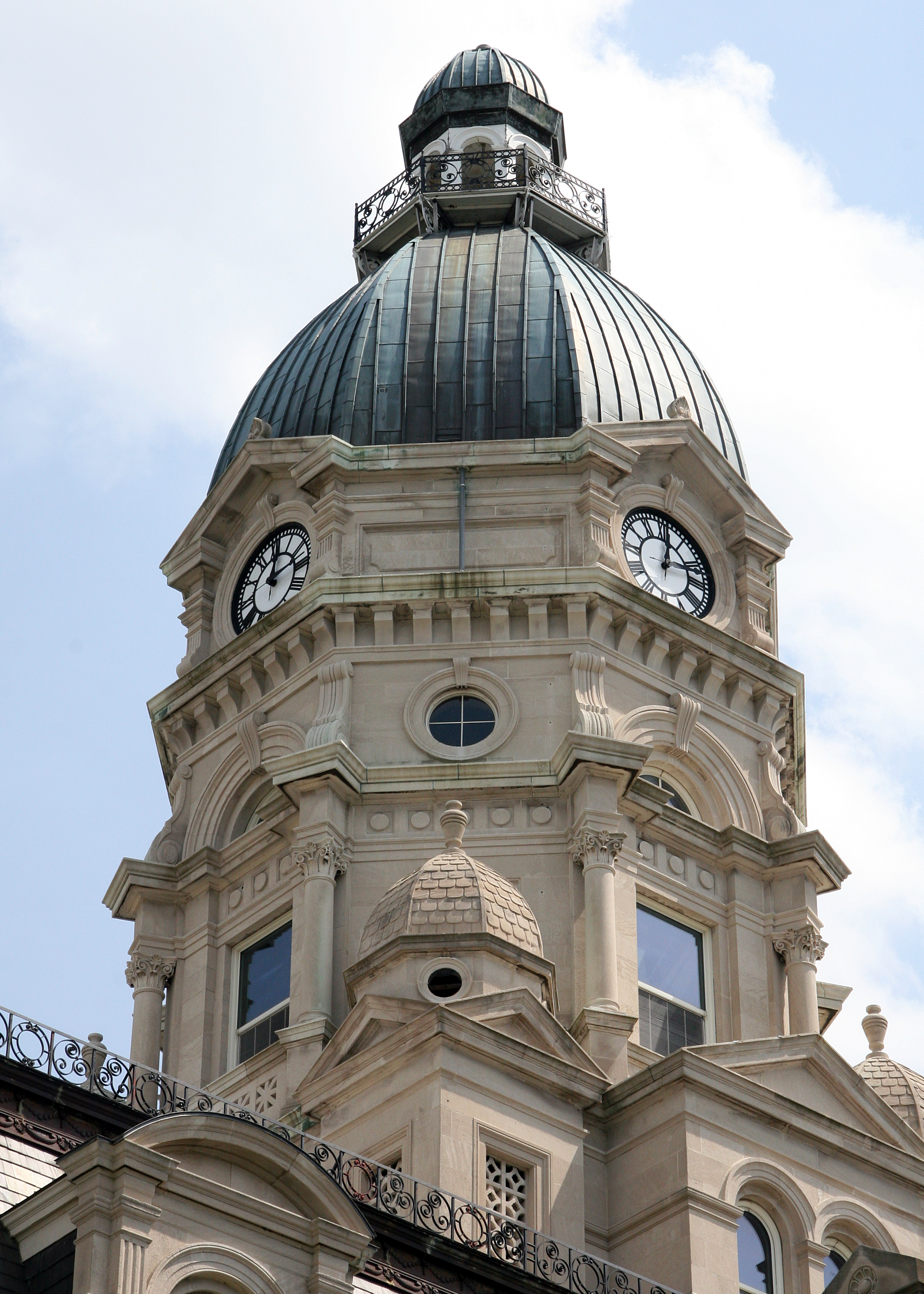
Dome and belltower

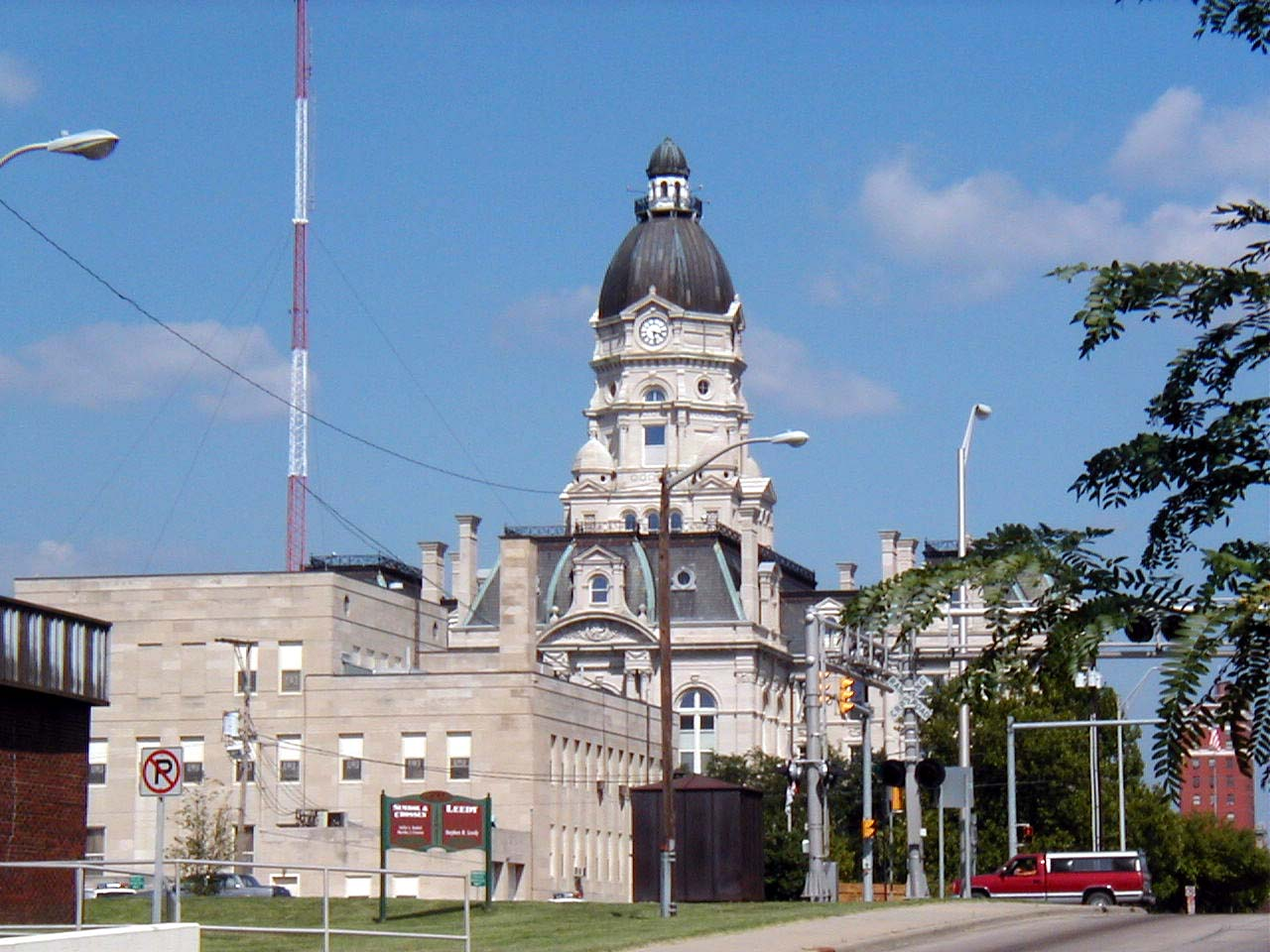
View from the west

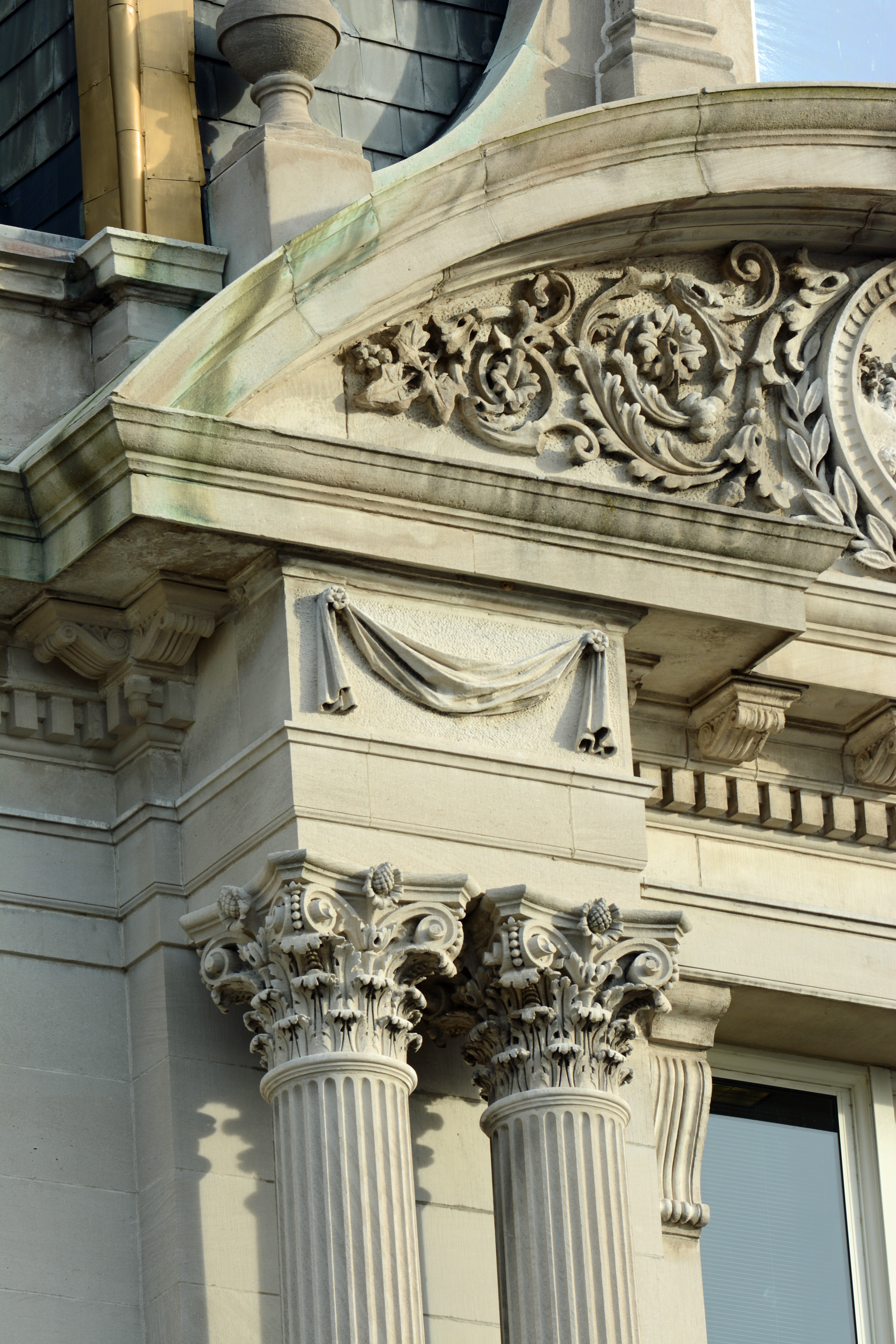
Details at top of column

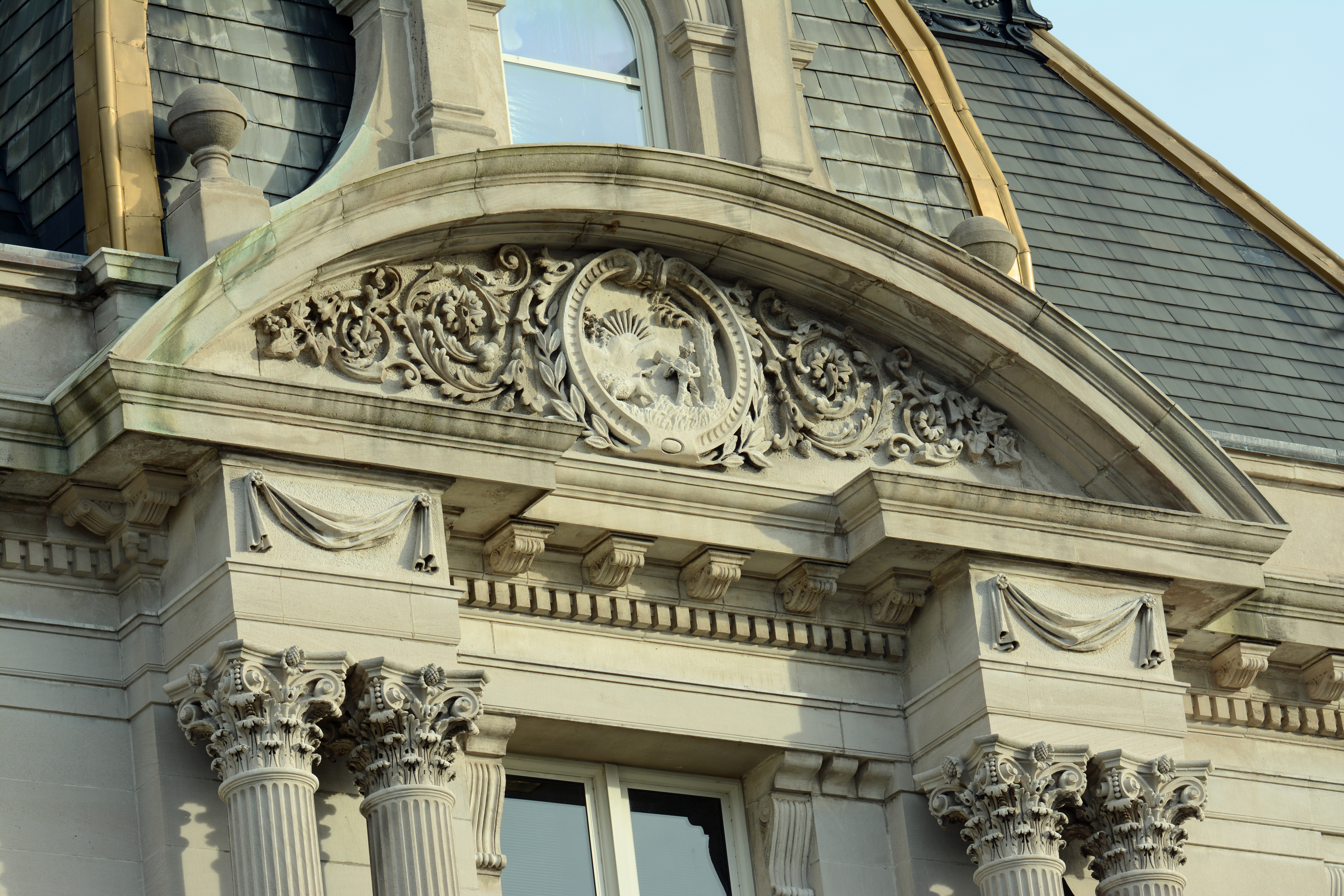
Details

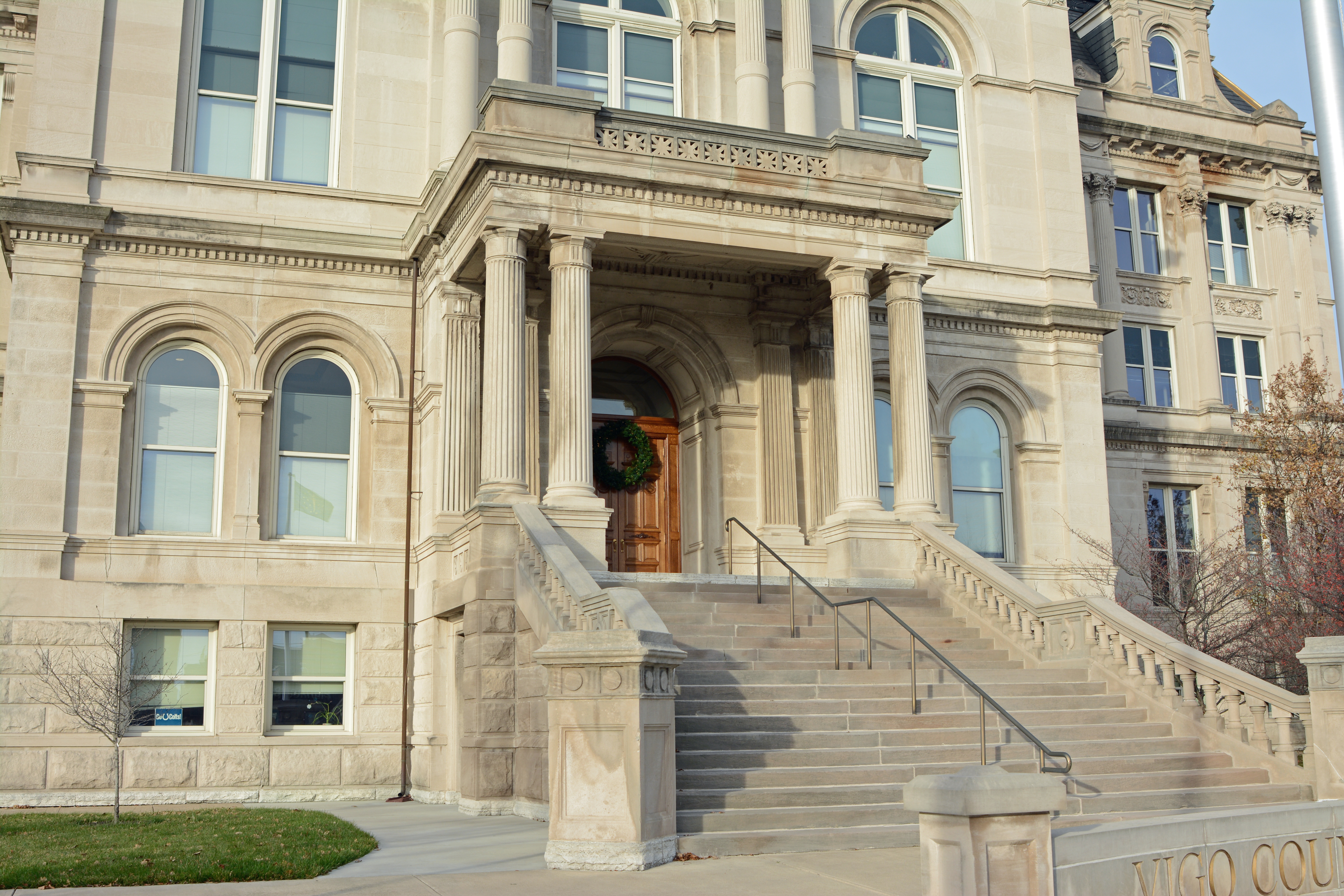
Entrance

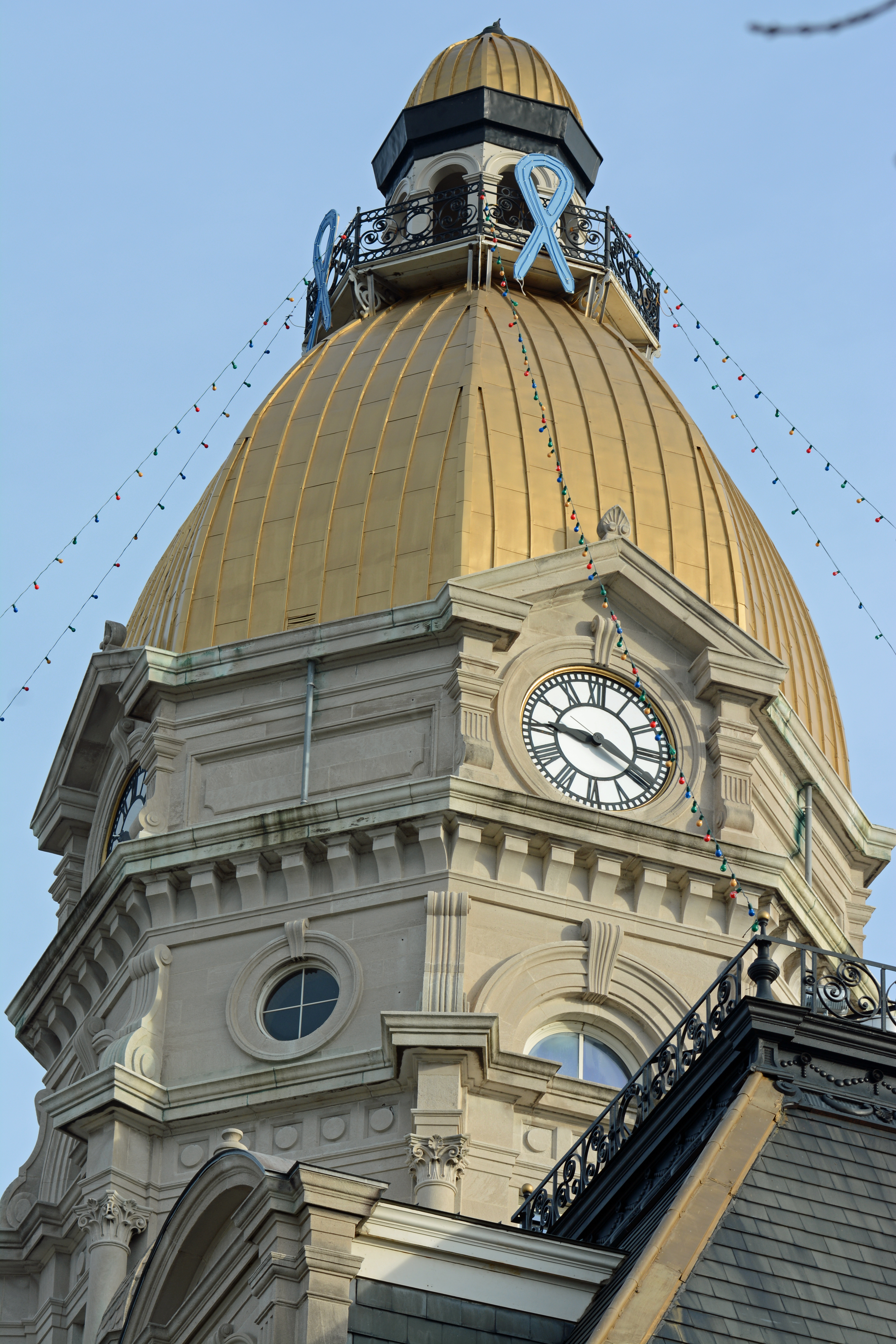
The dome after restoration
