= Bethany Congregational Church (West Terre Haute, Indiana) =

Historic church in Indiana, United States

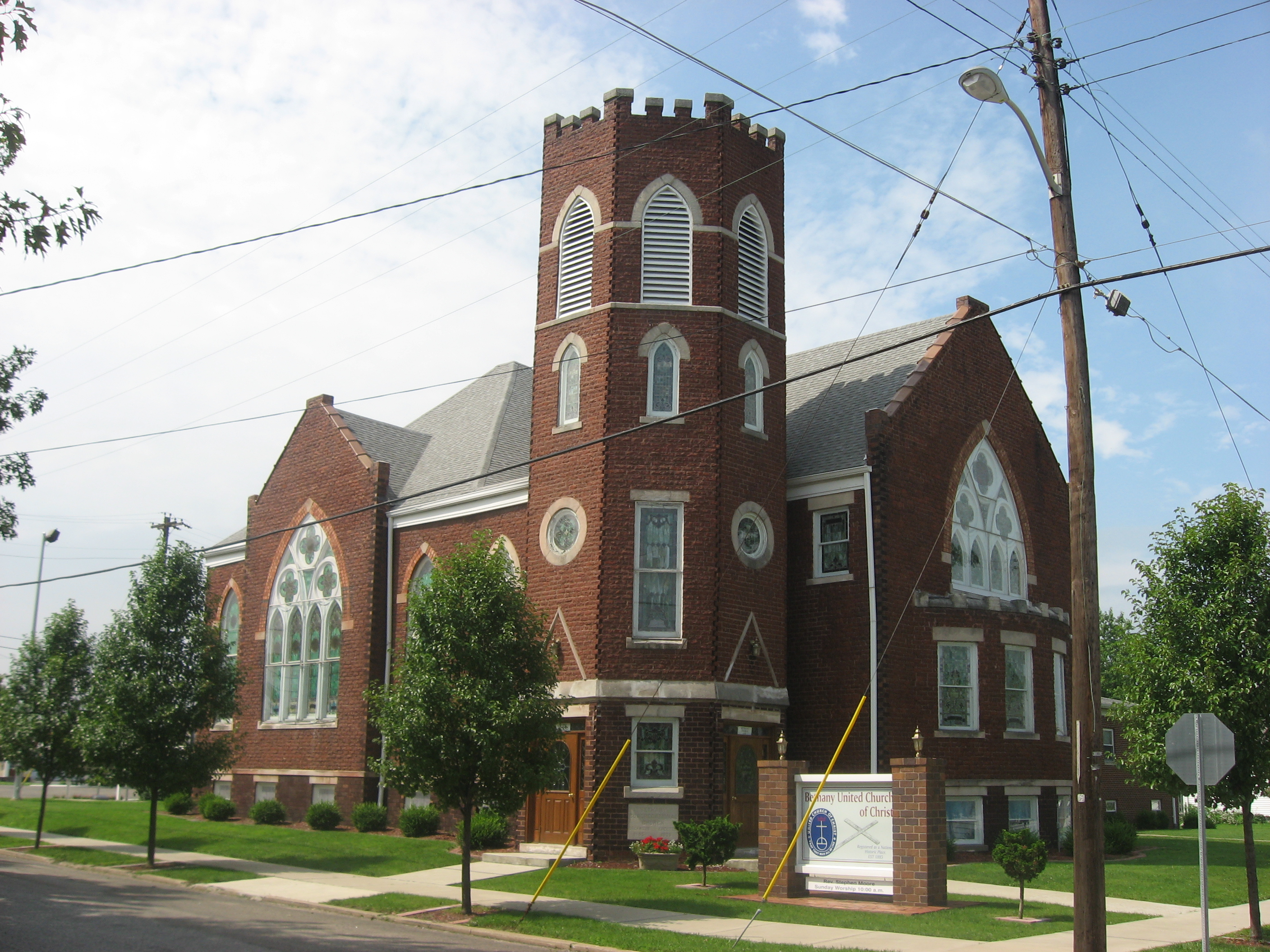

- Location within Vigo County, Indiana Location within Indiana Location within the United States

Religion
- Affiliation: United Church of Christ

Location
- Location: 201 W. Miller Ave., West Terre Haute, Indiana; United States
- State: Indiana
- Coordinates: 39.466944°N 87.445833°W

Architecture
- Architect: Charles Padgett
- Type: church (building)
- Style: Gothic

Specifications
- Direction of façade: East
- Materials: stone, brick, limestone

U.S. National Register of Historic Places
- Added to NRHP: September 28, 2003
- NRHP Reference no.: 75000030

Bethany Congregational Church or Bethany United Church of Christ is a historic Congregational church located at West Terre Haute, Indiana. It was built between 1907 and 1909, and is a Victorian Gothic-style church built of stone, brick and limestone. It features and octagonal corner bell tower and Gothic arched windows. The architect was Charles Padgett.

Bethany Congregational Church was placed on the National Register of Historic Places for its architectural significance in 2003.
