= Wabash Township, Clark County, Illinois =

Wabash Township
- Township
- Location in Clark County

- Clark County's location in Illinois
- Coordinates: 39°24′38″N 87°36′16″W
- Country: United States
- State: Illinois
- County: Clark
- Established: November 7, 1854

Area
  - Total: 73.11 sq mi (189.4 km^{2})
  - Land: 72.97 sq mi (189.0 km^{2})
  - Water: 0.14 sq mi (0.36 km^{2}) 0.19%
- Elevation: 558 ft (170 m)

Population (2020)
  - Total: 2,081
  - Density: 28.52/sq mi (11.01/km^{2})
- Time zone: UTC-6 (CST)
  - Summer (DST): UTC-5 (CDT)
- ZIP codes: 62423, 62441
- FIPS code: 17-023-78279
- GNIS feature ID: 429878

Wabash Township is one of fifteen townships in Clark County, Illinois, USA. As of the 2020 census, its population was 2,081 and it contained 966 housing units.

== Geography ==
According to the 2021 census gazetteer files, Wabash Township has a total area of 73.11 square miles (189.35 km^{2}), of which 72.97 square miles (188.99 km^{2}) (or 99.81%) is land and 0.14 square miles (0.36 km^{2}) (or 0.19%) is water.

=== Cities, towns, villages ===
- Marshall (east quarter)

=== Unincorporated towns ===
- Dennison
- Fox Run
- Golf Lakes
- Griffin (historical)
- McKeen

(This list is based on USGS data and may include former settlements.)

=== Cemeteries ===
The township contains these eleven cemeteries: Asbury, Big Creek, Black, Cumberland, Dean, Dennison, Farris, Liffick, Livingston, Mackey and Thompson.

=== Major highways ===
- Interstate 70
- U.S. Route 40
- Illinois Route 1

=== Airports and landing strips ===
- Kibler Airport

== Demographics ==
As of the 2020 census there were 2,081 people, 709 households, and 603 families residing in the township. The population density was 28.46 inhabitants per square mile (10.99/km^{2}). There were 966 housing units at an average density of 13.21 per square mile (5.10/km^{2}). The racial makeup of the township was 96.44% White, 0.00% African American, 0.19% Native American, 0.62% Asian, 0.00% Pacific Islander, 0.29% from other races, and 2.45% from two or more races. Hispanic or Latino of any race were 0.96% of the population.

There were 709 households, out of which 29.50% had children under the age of 18 living with them, 74.89% were married couples living together, 2.26% had a female householder with no spouse present, and 14.95% were non-families. 12.80% of all households were made up of individuals, and 10.60% had someone living alone who was 65 years of age or older. The average household size was 2.33 and the average family size was 2.47.

The township's age distribution consisted of 20.2% under the age of 18, 0.0% from 18 to 24, 25.2% from 25 to 44, 32.8% from 45 to 64, and 21.8% who were 65 years of age or older. The median age was 50.2 years. For every 100 females, there were 118.2 males. For every 100 females age 18 and over, there were 105.3 males.

The median income for a household in the township was $88,234, and the median income for a family was $87,547. Males had a median income of $60,333 versus $42,778 for females. The per capita income for the township was $41,188. About 2.2% of families and 4.4% of the population were below the poverty line, including none of those under age 18 and none of those age 65 or over.

Historical population
Census	Pop.	Note	%±
2010	2,257		—
2020	2,081		−7.8%
U.S. Decennial Census

== School districts ==
- Marshall Community Unit School District #C-2

== Political districts ==
- Illinois's 15th congressional district
- State House District 109
- State Senate District 55
