= West Terre Haute, Indiana =

- Town
- Location of West Terre Haute in Vigo County, Indiana.
- Coordinates: 39°27′50″N 87°27′02″W
- Country: United States
- State: Indiana
- County: Vigo
- Township: Sugar Creek

Area
  - Total: 0.75 sq mi (1.95 km^{2})
  - Land: 0.75 sq mi (1.95 km^{2})
  - Water: 0 sq mi (0.00 km^{2})
- Elevation: 472 ft (144 m)

Population (2020)
  - Total: 2,157
  - Density: 2,865.4/sq mi (1,106.35/km^{2})
- Time zone: UTC-5 (Eastern (EST))
  - Summer (DST): UTC-4 (EDT)
- ZIP code: 47885
- Area code: 812
- FIPS code: 18-83384
- GNIS feature ID: 2397734
- Website: www.townofwestterrehaute.com

West Terre Haute is a town in Sugar Creek Township, Vigo County, Indiana, on the western side of the Wabash River near Terre Haute. As of the 2020 census, West Terre Haute had a population of 2,157. It is part of the Terre Haute Metropolitan Statistical Area. Bethany Congregational Church was placed on the National Register of Historic Places in 2003.

== History ==
Originally called McQuilkinsville, then simply Macksville or Maxville, West Terre Haute was laid out by Samuel McQuilkin on November 22, 1836. The first building had been put up in 1833, and in 1834 McQuilkin opened a general store on the National Road between present-day Third and Fourth Streets. The store proved useful to those working on the National Road and made McQuilkinsville an important town in the area. Because of the town's fertile soil, soon people started settling there as vegetable farmers. John Griggs and his son Edward put up a flour mill in 1867, but the structure was burned in 1870. The town expanded quickly, with Smith Hinch building a tavern on the National Road and Richard McIlroy building a brick general store and post office in 1872.

In 1894 citizens of the town voted to change its name to West Terre Haute.

The West Terre Haute post office has been in operation since 1899.

Bethany Congregational Church was listed on the National Register of Historic Places in 2003.

=== Growth of industry ===
By 1878, industries included a lumber mill, a cigar factory, and a shingle manufacturer, and the town had grown to a population of 250.

With coal-bearing bluffs immediately to the town's north and west, coal mining became a major industry in the town. By 1906, West Terre Haute had eleven mines in operation, served by both railroads and wagon roads. These mines averaged a daily output of 2,000 tons.

Clay deposits in the town led to the production of clay products including building brick, paving brick, sewer pipe and drain tile. Four separate companies in the area worked in this industry, including the Vigo Clay Company, the Miller Brick Company, Terre Haute Brick and Pipe Company (also known as the Vitrified Brick Company), and the National Drain Tile Company.

Just north of West Terre Haute was a large gravel pit a mile in length at its widest point. The gravel was mainly used in railroad grades.

Due to increased employment opportunities, the population of West Terre Haute increased from several hundred in the 1880s to approximately 3500 by the mid-1890s. To accommodate these new residents and commuters, in 1905 a new bridge was built to cross the Wabash River including tracks for the city's streetcar and interurban line. The Bank of West Terre Haute was established that same year.

=== Decline of commerce ===
Beginning in the early 1920s, the coal, clay and gravel industries slowly declined. West Terre Haute became a mainly residential community for factory workers and miners. After the Great Depression, the town's businesses included automobile repair shops and grocers. However, business faded when I-70 was constructed and circumvented the town.

== Geography ==
West Terre Haute is separated from Terre Haute by the Wabash River and a strip of low land (known alternately as Dresser or Taylorville) on the west side of the river.

According to the 2010 census, West Terre Haute has a total area of 0.75 square miles (1.94 km^{2}), all land.

== Demographics ==
Historical population
Census	Pop.	Note	%±
1900	651		—
1910	3,083		373.6%
1920	4,310		39.8%
1930	3,588		−16.8%
1940	3,729		3.9%
1950	3,357		−10.0%
1960	3,006		−10.5%
1970	2,704		−10.0%
1980	2,806		3.8%
1990	2,495		−11.1%
2000	2,330		−6.6%
2010	2,236		−4.0%
2020	2,157		−3.5%
U.S. Decennial Census

=== 2020 census ===
As of the 2020 census, West Terre Haute had a population of 2,157. The median age was 36.5 years. 25.9% of residents were under the age of 18 and 14.8% of residents were 65 years of age or older. For every 100 females there were 100.7 males, and for every 100 females age 18 and over there were 92.2 males age 18 and over.

100.0% of residents lived in urban areas, while 0.0% lived in rural areas.

There were 830 households in West Terre Haute, of which 33.5% had children under the age of 18 living in them. Of all households, 37.1% were married-couple households, 18.1% were households with a male householder and no spouse or partner present, and 32.5% were households with a female householder and no spouse or partner present. About 28.8% of all households were made up of individuals and 15.0% had someone living alone who was 65 years of age or older.

There were 928 housing units, of which 10.6% were vacant. The homeowner vacancy rate was 1.1% and the rental vacancy rate was 7.8%.

Racial composition as of the 2020 census
Race	Number	Percent
White	2,024	93.8%
Black or African American	7	0.3%
American Indian and Alaska Native	13	0.6%
Asian	0	0.0%
Native Hawaiian and Other Pacific Islander	0	0.0%
Some other race	11	0.5%
Two or more races	102	4.7%
Hispanic or Latino (of any race)	33	1.5%

=== 2010 census ===
As of the census of 2010, there were 2,236 people, 839 households, and 588 families living in the town. The population density was 2,981.3 inhabitants per square mile (1,151.1/km^{2}). There were 975 housing units at an average density of 1,300.0 per square mile (501.9/km^{2}). The racial makeup of the town was 97.3% White, 0.5% African American, 0.6% Native American, 0.4% from other races, and 1.2% from two or more races. Hispanic or Latino of any race were 1.3% of the population.

There were 839 households, of which 38.0% had children under the age of 18 living with them, 41.2% were married couples living together, 20.7% had a female householder with no husband present, 8.1% had a male householder with no wife present, and 29.9% were non-families. 24.2% of all households were made up of individuals, and 11.7% had someone living alone who was 65 years of age or older. The average household size was 2.67 and the average family size was 3.09.

The median age in the town was 35.5 years. 26% of residents were under the age of 18; 10.8% were between the ages of 18 and 24; 26.6% were from 25 to 44; 23.9% were from 45 to 64; and 12.6% were 65 years of age or older. The gender makeup of the town was 48.4% male and 51.6% female.

=== 2000 census ===
As of the census of 2000, there were 2,330 people, 895 households, and 620 families living in the town. The population density was 3,082.4 inhabitants per square mile (1,190.1/km^{2}). There were 1,046 housing units at an average density of 1,383.8 per square mile (534.3/km^{2}). The racial makeup of the town was 97.55% White, 0.04% African American, 0.52% Native American, 0.47% Asian, 0.17% Pacific Islander, 0.04% from other races, and 1.20% from two or more races. Hispanic or Latino of any race were 0.56% of the population.

There were 895 households, out of which 36.3% had children under the age of 18 living with them, 48.0% were married couples living together, 16.0% had a female householder with no husband present, and 30.7% were non-families. 26.4% of all households were made up of individuals, and 12.1% had someone living alone who was 65 years of age or older. The average household size was 2.60 and the average family size was 3.12.

In the town, the population was spread out, with 29.1% under the age of 18, 9.6% from 18 to 24, 30.3% from 25 to 44, 19.2% from 45 to 64, and 11.8% who were 65 years of age or older. The median age was 32 years. For every 100 females, there were 93.2 males. For every 100 females age 18 and over, there were 88.7 males.

The median income for a household in the town was $25,954, and the median income for a family was $30,469. Males had a median income of $25,854 versus $19,618 for females. The per capita income for the town was $11,887. About 16.5% of families and 20.7% of the population were below the poverty line, including 27.4% of those under age 18 and 11.1% of those age 65 or over.

== Government ==
West Terre Haute and Terre Haute are separated by the Wabash River. Bridges connecting the two are located on US 40 and I-70. They are distinct political entities. West Terre Haute has its own town council, police department, street department, sewer department, and fire department, though the Vigo County Sheriff's Department has jurisdiction in both cities.

== Education ==
West Terre Haute is in the Vigo County School Corporation.
The town is in the attendance boundaries of these three schools (all outside of the town limits):

- Sugar Creek Consolidated Elementary School-Grades PreK-5
- West Vigo Middle School-Grades 6-8
- West Vigo High School-Grades 9-12

Fayette Elementary School has a West Terre Haute postal address, but is not in the town limits and does not include any part of the town boundary in its attendance zone.

West Terre Haute has a public library, a branch of the Vigo County Public Library.

== Transportation ==
West Terre Haute is the last community in Indiana encountered travelling westbound on US 40 before crossing into Illinois. Interstate 70 does not pass through West Terre Haute itself but skirts its southern edge. There are two exits on I-70 for West Terre Haute: Exit #1 (eastbound only) onto U.S. 40 and Exit #3 onto Darwin Road, though it is also marked for Saint Mary-of-the-Woods College, which is five miles (8 km) northwest of West Terre Haute.
