= Terre Haute metropolitan area =

Terre Haute Metropolitan Area
- Metropolitan Statistical Area
- Terre Haute, IN Metropolitan Statistical Area
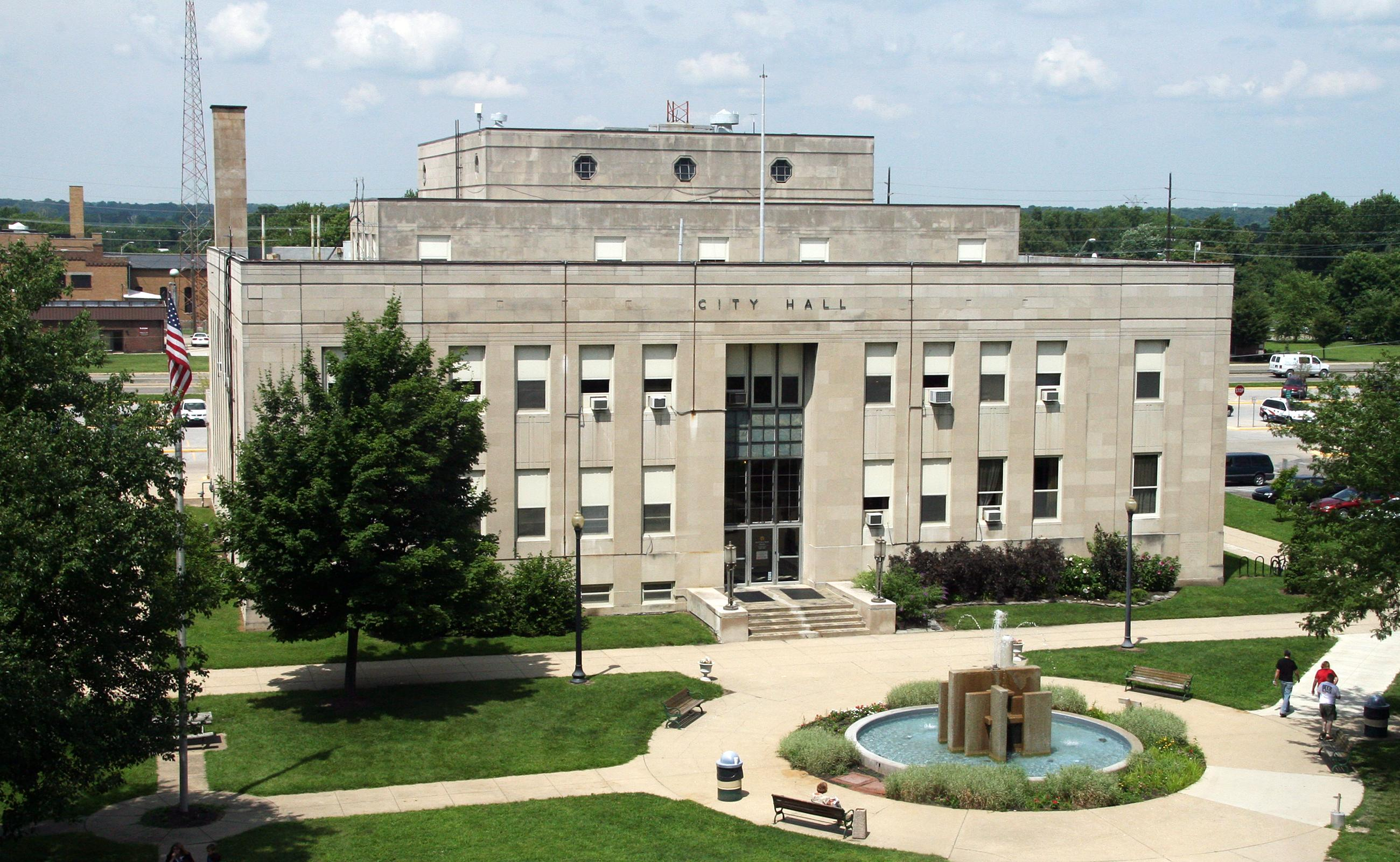
- Terre Haute City Hall in 2012
Interactive Map of Terre Haute, IN MSA
City of Terre Haute
Terre Haute, IN MSA
- Country: United States
- State: Indiana
- Largest city: Terre Haute

The Terre Haute Metropolitan Statistical Area, also known as the Wabash Valley, is the 227th largest Metropolitan Statistical Area (MSA) in the United States. Centering on the city of Terre Haute, Indiana, it was originally formed by the United States Census Bureau in 1950 and consisted of Vigo County. As surrounding counties saw an increase in their population densities and the number of their residents employed within Vigo County, they met Census criteria to be added to the MSA. Four Indiana counties are now a part of this MSA.

| Geographic Area | July 1, 2015 | 2010 Census | July 1, 2005 | 2000 Census | 1990 Census | 1980 Census | 1970 Census | 1960 Census | 1950 Census |
|---|---|---|---|---|---|---|---|---|---|
| Vigo County | 107,896 | 107,848 | 102,592 | 105,848 | 106,107 | 112,385 | 114,528 | 108,458 | 105,160 |
| Clay County | 26,503 | 26,890 | 27,142 | 26,556 | 24,705 | 24,862 | 23,933 | (Note: The county was not a part of the Terre Haute MSA at the time.) | |
| Sullivan County | 20,928 | 21,475 | 21,763 | 21,751 | | | | | |
| Vermillion County | 15,692 | 16,212 | 16,562 | 16,788 | | | | | |
| Terre Haute MSA | 171,019 | 172,425 | 168,059 | 170,943 | 130,812 | 137,247 | 137,461 | 108,458 | 105,160 |
