= National Register of Historic Places listings in Vigo County, Indiana =

Location of Vigo County in Indiana

This is intended to be a complete list of the properties and districts on the National Register of Historic Places in Vigo County, Indiana, United States. Latitude and longitude coordinates are provided for many National Register properties and districts; these locations may be seen together in a map.

There are 54 properties and districts listed on the National Register in the county, including one National Historic Landmark. Another five properties were once listed but have been removed.

Properties and districts located in incorporated areas display the name of the municipality, while properties and districts in unincorporated areas display the name of their civil township. Properties and districts split between multiple jurisdictions display the names of all jurisdictions.

This National Park Service list is complete through NPS recent listings posted September 18, 2026.

== Current listings ==
	Name on the Register	Image	Date listed	Location	City or town	Description
1	Allen Chapel African Methodist Episcopal Church	Allen Chapel African Methodist Episcopal Church	September 5, 1975 (#75000030)	224 Crawford St. 39°27′35″N 87°24′51″W	Terre Haute	The African Methodist Episcopal congregation in Terre Haute began meeting in 1837. The original structure was part of the Underground Railroad. The Chapel and its school have been noteworthy in the African American culture of the region.
2	Bethany Congregational Church	Bethany Congregational Church	September 28, 2003 (#03000986)	201 W. Miller Ave. 39°28′01″N 87°26′45″W	West Terre Haute	
3	Branch of State Bank of Indiana (Memorial Hall)	Branch of State Bank of Indiana (Memorial Hall)	October 25, 1973 (#73000026)	219 Ohio St. 39°27′55″N 87°24′53″W	Terre Haute	
4	Building at 23–27 S. Sixth Street	Building at 23–27 S. Sixth Street	June 30, 1983 (#83000111)	23–27 S. 6th St. 39°27′57″N 87°24′36″W	Terre Haute	
5	Building at 510–516 Ohio Street	Building at 510–516 Ohio Street	June 30, 1983 (#83000152)	510–516 Ohio St. 39°27′57″N 87°24′39″W	Terre Haute	
6	Building at 810 Wabash Avenue	Building at 810 Wabash Avenue	June 30, 1983 (#83000153)	810 Wabash Ave. 39°28′00″N 87°24′19″W	Terre Haute	
7	Butternut Hill	Butternut Hill	May 27, 1993 (#93000469)	4430 Wabash Ave. 39°28′33″N 87°21′07″W	Terre Haute	
8	Carr's Hall	Carr's Hall	June 30, 1983 (#83000154)	329–333 Walnut St. 39°27′52″N 87°24′46″W	Terre Haute	
9	Citizens' Trust Company Building	Citizens' Trust Company Building	June 30, 1983 (#83000156)	19–21 S. 6th St. 39°27′58″N 87°24′36″W	Terre Haute	
10	Collett Park	Collett Park	December 10, 1981 (#81000021)	N. 7th St. and Maple Ave. 39°29′38″N 87°24′21″W	Terre Haute	A city park established in 1883 on land donated by railroad entrepreneur Josephus Collett. 21 acres (85,000 m^{2}) in size, the tree-filled park included a pavilion built in 1894 by J. Merrill Sherman.
11	Collett Park Neighborhood Historic District	Collett Park Neighborhood Historic District	March 22, 2004 (#04000207)	Roughly bounded by 7th St., Maple Ave., 11th St., and Florida Ave. 39°29′44″N 87°24′18″W	Terre Haute	A residential neighborhood surrounding Collett Park, the district is known for its homes, many built between 1900 and 1920. Architectural styles include Queen Anne Style, Shingle Style and Colonial Revival.
12	Condit House	Condit House	April 2, 1973 (#73000023)	629 Mulberry St. on the Indiana State University campus 39°28′06″N 87°24′32″W	Terre Haute	Official residence of the President of Indiana State University; built in 1860 and bequeathed to the University in 1962. Oldest building on the campus.
13	Country Club of Terre Haute		January 2, 2026 (#100012495)	57 Allendale; 39°23′37″N 87°22′49″W	Terre Haute	
14	Eugene V. Debs House	Eugene V. Debs House	November 13, 1966 (#66000008)	451 N. 8th St. 39°28′18″N 87°24′20″W	Terre Haute	This house was built in 1890 by Eugene V. Debs and his wife Kate. The building, within the campus of Indiana State University, is now a museum commemorating Debs' life.
15	Paul Dresser Birthplace	Paul Dresser Birthplace	January 22, 1973 (#73000024)	1st and Farrington Sts. 39°27′24″N 87°25′02″W	Terre Haute	The birthplace and family home of composer Paul Dresser, this structure was originally at a different location in the town. When threatened by urban renewal in the 1960s, the home was moved to its current location in Fairbanks Park near the Wabash River.
16	Ehrmann Building		August 21, 2020 (#100005502)	929 Wabash Ave. 39°28′00″N 87°24′12″W	Terre Haute	
17	Farrington's Grove Historic District	Farrington's Grove Historic District	February 27, 1986 (#86000270)	Roughly bounded by Poplar, S. 7th, Hulman, and S. 4th Sts. 39°27′22″N 87°24′35″W	Terre Haute	
18	Fire Station No. 9	Fire Station No. 9	December 16, 1982 (#82000049)	1728 S. 8th St. 39°26′51″N 87°24′19″W	Terre Haute	
19	First Congregational Church	First Congregational Church	June 30, 1983 (#83000157)	630 Ohio St. 39°27′57″N 87°24′33″W	Terre Haute	
20	First National Bank	First National Bank	May 7, 1992 (#83004576)	509 Wabash Ave. 39°27′59″N 87°24′39″W	Terre Haute	
21	Greenwood Elementary School	Greenwood Elementary School	September 26, 1997 (#97001177)	145 E. Voorhees Ave. 39°26′26″N 87°24′56″W	Terre Haute	
22	Highland Lawn Cemetery	Highland Lawn Cemetery	November 29, 1990 (#90001790)	4520 Wabash Ave. 39°28′45″N 87°20′46″W	Terre Haute	Opened in 1884, the cemetery features Richardsonian Romanesque landscaping and architecture from the late 19th century. Famous interments include Eugene V. Debs, Max Ehrmann, and Valeska Suratt.
23	Hippodrome Theatre	Hippodrome Theatre	June 30, 1983 (#83000110)	727 Ohio St. 39°27′55″N 87°24′21″W	Terre Haute	The Hippodrome was designed by noted theater architect John Eberson. The German Renaissance structure opened in 1915 and became a spot for opera, theater, and vaudeville. The building is currently owned by the Scottish Rite.
24	House at 823 Ohio Street	House at 823 Ohio Street	June 30, 1983 (#83003441)	823 Ohio St. 39°27′55″N 87°24′18″W	Terre Haute	
25	Indiana Theatre	Indiana Theatre	November 13, 1997 (#83004578)	683 Ohio St. 39°27′55″N 87°24′26″W	Terre Haute	The Theatre was built by Terre Haute resident T.W. Barhydt to be a lasting gift to the city of Terre Haute and it was designed by America’s preeminent designer John Eberson to be his first prototype atmospheric theater which became his signature style that is recognized to be the gold standard of American theatre design.
26	Linton Township High School and Community Building	Linton Township High School and Community Building	March 20, 2002 (#02000200)	13041 Pimento Circle at Pimento; 39°18′30″N 87°23′06″W	Linton Township	
27	Markle House and Mill Site	Markle House and Mill Site	September 10, 1979 (#79000023)	4900 Mill Dam Rd. at North Terre Haute; 39°31′38″N 87°20′48″W	Otter Creek Township	
28	Miller-Parrott Baking Company Building		March 11, 2019 (#100003516)	1450 Wabash Ave. 39°28′07″N 87°23′36″W	Terre Haute	
29	New Goshen District No. 2 School	New Goshen District No. 2 School	September 12, 2016 (#16000613)	9620 Rangeline Place; 39°34′56″N 87°27′45″W	Fayette Township	
30	Ohio Boulevard-Deming Park Historic District	Ohio Boulevard-Deming Park Historic District	September 14, 1989 (#89001425)	Roughly Ohio Boulevard from 19th to Keane; 39°27′57″N 87°21′39″W	Terre Haute	Designed by architect and city planner George E. Kessler and developed by landowner Demas Deming, Jr, the boulevard is 1.5 miles (2.4 km) lined with trees and homes, with a median maintained as city park land.
31	Rea Park		June 12, 2017 (#100001065)	3500 S. 7th St. 39°25′27″N 87°24′24″W	Terre Haute	
32	Rocky Edge		December 1, 2020 (#100005872)	46 Allendale; 39°23′41″N 87°23′23″W	Terre Haute	
33	Chauncey Rose Memorial Plaza		September 18, 2026 (#100013347)	Dresser Drive in Fairbanks Park; 39°27′36″N 87°25′05″W	Terre Haute	
34	Sage-Robinson-Nagel House	Sage-Robinson-Nagel House	April 11, 1973 (#73000025)	1411 S. 6th St. 39°27′07″N 87°24′36″W	Terre Haute	
35	Saint Mary-of-the-Woods Historic District		September 18, 2017 (#100001616)	Roughly bounded by St. Mary's Rd., 1840 Way St., Grove and Orchard Lns., Woods Way, and College Rd. 2; 39°30′34″N 87°27′52″W	Sugar Creek Township	
36	Frank Senour Round Barn	Frank Senour Round Barn	April 2, 1993 (#93000193)	6400 E. Oregon Church Rd., northwest of Blackhawk; 39°20′07″N 87°19′10″W	Pierson Township	Built in 1905 in the heyday of round barn construction, it is a true round barn with no angles in its circumference and a conical roof. Part of a multiple listing of historic Indiana barns.
37	Spruce Street A. M. E. Church & Parsonage		January 20, 2026 (#100012586)	1660 Spruce Street & 518 N. 19th Street. 39°28′26″N 87°23′19″W	Terre Haute	
38	Star Building	Star Building	June 30, 1983 (#83000158)	601–603 Ohio St. 39°27′55″N 87°24′35″W	Terre Haute	
39	State Normal Library	State Normal Library	June 27, 2002 (#02000690)	626 Eagle St. 39°28′11″N 87°24′30″W	Terre Haute	
40	Terminal Arcade	Terminal Arcade	June 30, 1983 (#83000159)	822 Wabash Ave. 39°28′00″N 87°24′17″W	Terre Haute	This beaux-arts structure was designed by Daniel H. Burnham and was originally an interurban train station. Made of terra cotta and brick, it has identical facades on the north and south sides. Currently the building is a bar restaurant.
41	Terre Haute City Hall	Terre Haute City Hall	December 2, 2020 (#100005875)	17 Harding Ave. 39°27′57″N 87°24′57″W	Terre Haute	
42	Terre Haute Fire Station No. 8	Terre Haute Fire Station No. 8	June 15, 2000 (#00000668)	1831 Wabash Ave. 39°28′08″N 87°23′19″W	Terre Haute	
43	Terre Haute Masonic Temple	Terre Haute Masonic Temple	June 9, 1995 (#95000705)	224 N. 8th St. 39°28′09″N 87°24′22″W	Terre Haute	
44	Terre Haute Post Office and Federal Building	Terre Haute Post Office and Federal Building	August 13, 1984 (#84003813)	7th and Cherry Sts. 39°28′02″N 87°24′27″W	Terre Haute	
45	Terre Haute YMCA Building		June 3, 2019 (#100004047)	200 S. 6th St. 39°27′51″N 87°24′36″W	Terre Haute	
46	Twelve Points Historic District	Twelve Points Historic District	April 20, 2005 (#05000314)	Lafayette Ave. from Linden to 13th St. and Maple Ave. from Garfield to 13th St. 39°29′31″N 87°23′56″W	Terre Haute	
47	Vigo County Courthouse	Vigo County Courthouse	June 30, 1983 (#83000160)	Courthouse Sq. 39°27′57″N 87°24′52″W	Terre Haute	Designed by architect Samuel Hannaford in the Second Empire style, the courthouse was dedicated in 1883 and is the seat of government in Vigo County. Features a two-ton bell partially funded by money left in the will of Colonel Francis Vigo.
48	Vigo County Home for Dependent Children	Vigo County Home for Dependent Children	June 15, 2000 (#00000674)	7140 Wabash Ave., east of Terre Haute; 39°29′16″N 87°18′21″W	Lost Creek Township	
49	Wabash Avenue-East Historic District	Wabash Avenue-East Historic District	June 30, 1983 (#83000040)	Wabash Ave. and 7th and 8th Sts.; also 26-34 8th St.; also roughly bounded by 6th, Ohio, 7th, and Walnut Sts. 39°27′59″N 87°24′24″W	Terre Haute	Second and third sets of boundaries represent boundary adjustments of September 16, 1992 (5 properties removed, one new property added) and September 20, 2006 (3 properties removed, 13 new properties added)
50	Wabash Avenue-West Historic District	Wabash Avenue-West Historic District	June 30, 1983 (#83000041)	Wabash Ave. and 6th St. 39°28′00″N 87°24′39″W	Terre Haute	
51	Booker T. Washington School	Booker T. Washington School	October 16, 2002 (#02001170)	1201 S. 13th St. 39°27′15″N 87°23′53″W	Terre Haute	
52	Wesley Foundation Student Center		May 17, 2022 (#100007741)	321 North 7th St. 39°28′12″N 87°24′25″W	Terre Haute	
53	Williams-Warren-Zimmerman House	Williams-Warren-Zimmerman House	October 23, 1980 (#80000046)	900–904 S. 4th St. 39°27′27″N 87°24′44″W	Terre Haute	
54	Woodrow Wilson Junior High School	Woodrow Wilson Junior High School	March 25, 1996 (#96000285)	301 S. 25th St. 39°27′50″N 87°22′48″W	Terre Haute	

== Former listings ==
	Name on the Register	Image	Date listed	Date removed	Location	City or town	Description
1	Chamber of Commerce Building	Chamber of Commerce Building	June 30, 1983 (#83000155)	March 5, 2019	627 Cherry St. 39°28′02″N 87°24′31″W	Terre Haute	
2	DeWees-Preston-Smith House		December 27, 1982 (#82000048)	July 24, 1989	1339 Poplar St.	Terre Haute	
3	Foley Hall	Foley Hall	March 21, 1985 (#85000595)	March 5, 2019	Saint Mary-of-the-Woods College campus, off U.S. Route 150; 39°30′38″N 87°27′44″W	Sugar Creek Township	Demolished
4	House at 209–211 S. Ninth Street	House at 209–211 S. Ninth Street	June 30, 1983 (#83000109)	March 5, 2019	209–211 S. 9th St. 39°27′50″N 87°24′16″W	Terre Haute	
5	Phoenix Club		June 30, 1983 (#83000108)	May 24, 1993	201 S. 5th St.	Terre Haute	

== See also ==
- List of National Historic Landmarks in Indiana
- National Register of Historic Places listings in Indiana
- Listings in neighboring counties: Clark (IL), Clay, Edgar (IL), Parke, Sullivan, Vermillion
- List of Indiana state historical markers in Vigo County
