= List of Indiana state historical markers in Vigo County =

Location of Vigo County in Indiana

This is a list of the Indiana state historical markers in Vigo County.

This is intended to be a complete list of the official state historical markers placed in Vigo County, Indiana, United States by the Indiana Historical Bureau. The locations of the historical markers and their latitude and longitude coordinates are included below when available, along with their names, years of placement, and topics as recorded by the Historical Bureau. There are 15 historical markers located in Vigo County.

== Historical markers ==
Marker title	Image	Year placed	Location	Topics
Birthplace of Paul Dresser (1859–1906)		1966	Junction of Dresser Drive and 1st Street at Fairbanks Park in Terre Haute; 39°27′24″N 87°25′1″W	Arts and Culture
Chauncey Rose 1794-1877		1966	Northeastern corner of the junction of Chestnut and Seventh Streets in Terre Haute; 39°28′14.4″N 87°24′25″W	Business, Industry, and Labor
Birthplace of Paul Dresser (1859) (one block west)		1966	In the median at the junction of Third and Farrington Streets in Terre Haute; 39°27′24″N 87°24′49.9″W	Arts and Culture
Eugene Victor Debs 1855-1926		1976	Southwestern corner of Marks Field at Indiana State University in Terre Haute; 39°28′14.4″N 87°24′49″W	Business, Industry, and Labor, Politics
[Charles Gene Abrell]		1982	Along State Road 63 at the Wabash River on the northern side of Terre Haute; 39°29′54″N 87°25′13″W	Military
Home of Eugene V. Debs		1992	451 N. Eighth Street in Terre Haute; 39°28′19″N 87°24′20″W	Business, Industry, and Labor, Historic District, Neighborhoods, and Towns, Politics
Union Hospital		1992	Northwestern corner of the junction of Seventh Street and 8th Avenue in Terre Haute; 39°29′5.6″N 87°24′26″W	Science, Medicine, and Inventions, Women
Birthplace of the Coca-Cola Bottle		1994	Northeastern corner of the junction of Third and Voorhees Streets in Terre Haute; 39°26′28.2″N 87°24′49″W	Business, Industry, and Labor, Arts and Culture
Crossroads of America		1998	Northwestern corner of the junction of Seventh Street and Wabash Avenue in Terre Haute; 39°28′0″N 87°24′26″W	Transportation
Markle Mill Site		2001	4900 Mill Dam Road in North Terre Haute; 39°31′40″N 87°20′48″W	Business, Industry, and Labor
Wea Tribe at Terre Haute		2004	Junction of First and Oak Streets at Fairbanks Park in Terre Haute; 39°27′40″N 87°25′1″W	American Indian/Native American
Saint Theodora Guérin		2009	Sisters of Providence motherhouse grounds, located on Grotto Lane directly across from Our Lady of Lourdes Grotto at Saint Mary-of-the-Woods; 39°30′31.5″N 87°27′40″W	Education & Libraries, Women, Religion
Little Syria on the Wabash		2018	NW corner of Cherry St. and 5th St., Terre Haute; 39°28′3.5″N 87°24′41.4″W	Immigration & Ethnic Group, Religion
Evangeline E Harris		2018	Indiana State University, 550 Chestnut St., (just north of the Hulman Memorial Student Union in the green space between Hines Hall and Sandison Hall) Terre Haute; 39°28′19″N 87°24′36″W	African American, Education
Hungarian Community		2023	24th St. and Maple Ave., Terre Haute; 39°29′31″N 87°22′52″W	Immigration and Ethnic Group

== See also ==
- List of Indiana state historical markers
- National Register of Historic Places listings in Vigo County, Indiana
