= Preston Smith =

Preston Smith may refer to:

== People ==
- Preston Smith (American football coach) (1871–1945), American football coach at Colgate University
- Preston Smith (linebacker) (born 1992), American football defensive end
- Preston Smith (governor) (1912–2003), Texas governor, 1969–1973
- Preston Smith (general) (1823–1863), Civil War Confederate general
- Preston Smith (Georgia state politician), Georgia state senator, 2002–2011
- Preston Smith (musician), singer/songwriter from Houston, Texas

== Other uses ==
- Lubbock Preston Smith International Airport, an airport serving Lubbock in Texas, USA
- Preston Smith Library of the Health Sciences, Texas Tech University Health Sciences Center, Lubbock, Texas, USA
- Preston E. Smith Unit, Lamesa, Dawson County, Texas, USA; a Texas state prison

== See also ==
- Anthony Preston Smith (1812–1877), U.S. horticulturalist
- Preston Smith Brooks (1819–1857), U.S. politician and slaver
- John Smith Preston (1809–1881), U.S. politician and planter
- DeWees-Preston-Smith House, Terre Haute, Indiana, USA
- Preston (disambiguation)
- Smith (disambiguation)
