= Eugene V. Debs Foundation =

Non-profit educational foundation

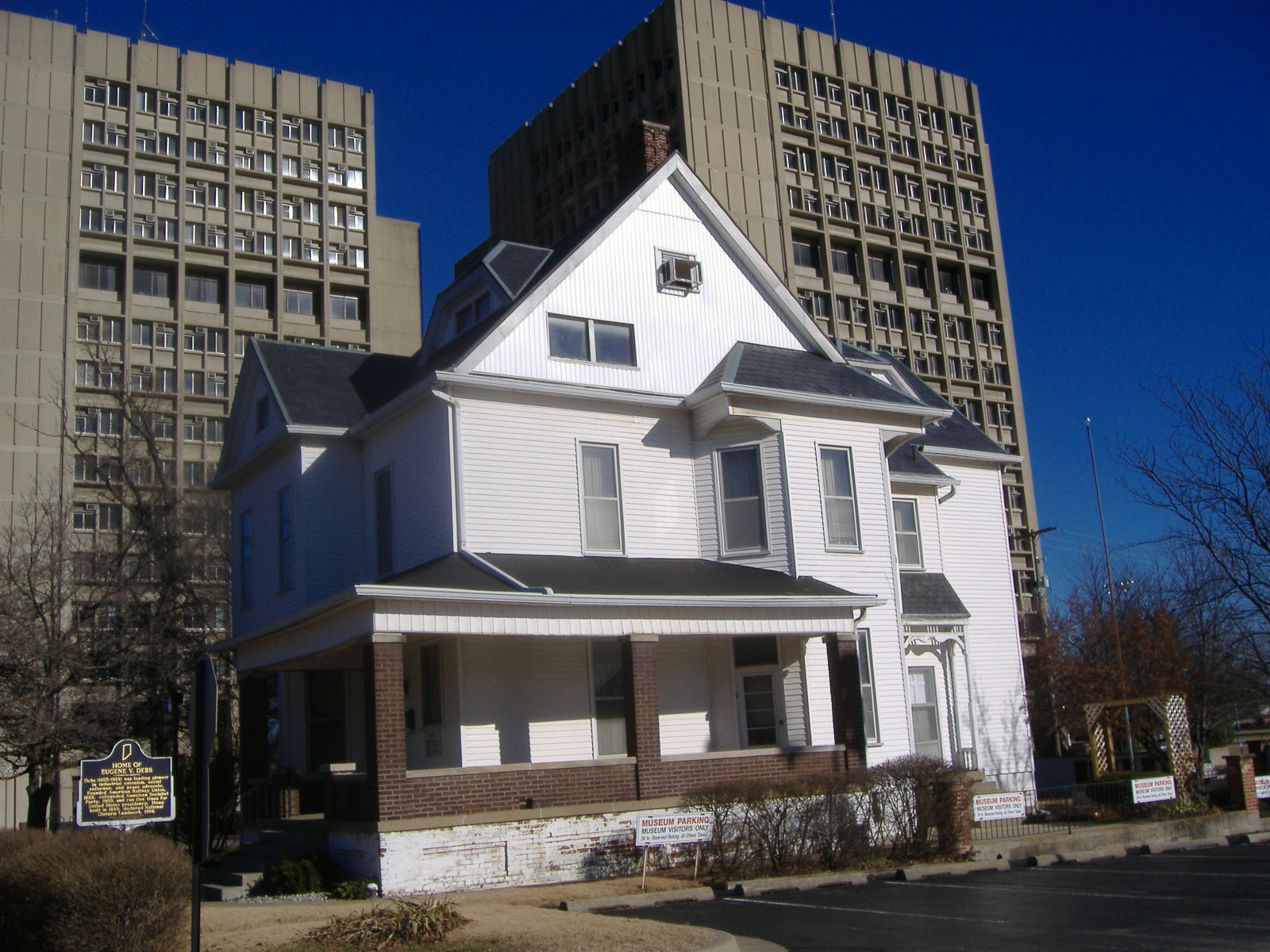
- Eugene V. Debs Home
- Founded: 1962
- Type: Non-profit
- Purpose: Labor unionism; peace activism; socialism
- Location: Terre Haute, Indiana, US
- President: Noel Beasley
- Website: debsfoundation.org

The Eugene V. Debs Foundation is a non-profit educational foundation, founded in 1962 "to own, maintain and operate the Eugene V. Debs Home in order to be a memorial to Eugene V. Debs and Theodore Debs". The foundation's president is Noel Beasley.

In 1964, Debs' residence became a museum owned by the foundation. It was opened as a museum by the foundation in 1965, and the foundation "has carefully restored the interior and acquired many of the memorabilia and furniture of Gene Debs and his wife, Kate." The house became a National Historic Landmark in 1966.

== Eugene V. Debs Award ==
Beginning in 1965, the Foundation began to honor people and organizations with its annual award, the Eugene V. Debs Award. The award is dedicated to those "keeping alive the spirit of progressivism, humanitarianism and social criticism epitomized by Debs." Honorees have included labor leaders and social justice activists, including Jesse Jackson, Walter Reuther, Dolores Huerta, Howard Zinn, and Eliseo Medina.
