= Burnett, Indiana =

- Unincorporated community
- Vigo County's location in Indiana

- location in Vigo County, Indiana
- Coordinates: 39°32′38″N 87°17′57″W
- Country: United States
- State: Indiana
- County: Vigo
- Township: Otter Creek
- Founded by: Stephen Grover and Hanna Creal Burnett
- Elevation: 532 ft (162 m)
- Time zone: UTC-5 (EST)
  - Summer (DST): UTC-4 (EDT)
- ZIP code: 47805
- Area codes: 812, 930
- FIPS code: 18-9298
- GNIS feature ID: 2830565

Burnett is an unincorporated community in Otter Creek Township, Vigo County, in the U.S. state of Indiana.

It is part of the Terre Haute Metropolitan Statistical Area.

== History ==
Burnett was founded by Stephen Grover Burnett and his wife Hanna Creal Burnett c. 1835. By 1890, it had an active post office and a practicing physician, Dr. Seth B. Melton. The post office at Burnett was established in 1870, and remained in operation until it was discontinued in 1934.

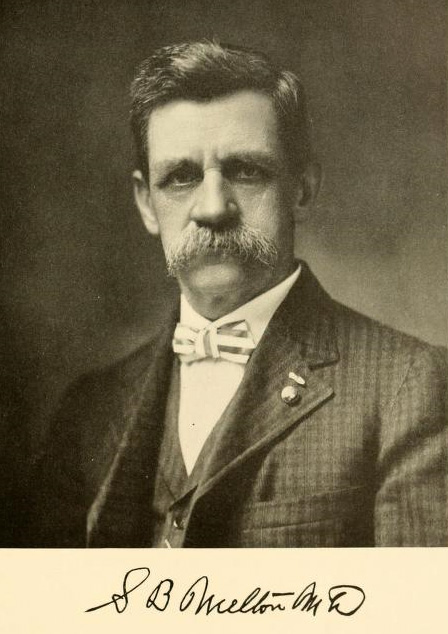
Dr. Seth B. Melton c. 1908

== Demographics ==
The United States Census Bureau delineated Burnett as a census designated place in the 2022 American Community Survey.
