= Sandcut, Indiana =

- Unincorporated community
- Nickname: Meltonville
- Vigo County's location in Indiana

- location in Vigo County, Indiana
- Coordinates: 39°33′53″N 87°19′25″W
- Country: United States
- State: Indiana
- County: Vigo
- Township: Otter Creek
- Elevation: 520 ft (160 m)
- Time zone: UTC-5 (Eastern (EST))
  - Summer (DST): UTC-4 (EDT)
- ZIP code: 47805
- Area codes: 812, 930
- GNIS feature ID: 442993

Sandcut is an unincorporated community in Otter Creek Township, Vigo County, in the U.S. state of Indiana. It is part of the Terre Haute metropolitan area. Little Gundy Creek flows on the southeastern side of Sandcut. Sandcut also has a volunteer fire department.

== History ==
Sandcut was founded in 1927, and was so named because of its sandy soil.

== Geography ==
Sandcut is located at the intersection of Rio Grande Avenue and Rosedale Road, at 39°33′53″N 87°19′25″W.
