= Spelterville, Indiana =

- Unincorporated community
- Vigo County's location in Indiana

- location in Vigo County, Indiana
- Coordinates: 39°31′40″N 87°23′54″W
- Country: United States
- State: Indiana
- County: Vigo
- Township: Otter Creek
- Elevation: 512 ft (156 m)
- Time zone: UTC-5 (Eastern (EST))
  - Summer (DST): UTC-4 (EDT)
- ZIP code: 47805
- Area codes: 812, 930
- GNIS feature ID: 443933

Spelterville is an unincorporated community in southwestern Otter Creek Township, Vigo County, in the U.S. state of Indiana.

It is part of the Terre Haute metropolitan area.

== History ==
A post office was established at Spelterville in 1920, and remained in operation until it was discontinued in 1934. The community was named after the mineral spelter, which was once manufactured in the town.

== Geography ==
Spelterville is located at 39°31′40″N 87°23′54″W at an elevation of 512 feet.
