= Markles, Indiana =

- Unincorporated community
- Vigo County's location in Indiana

- location in Vigo County, Indiana
- Coordinates: 39°31′37″N 87°21′07″W
- Country: United States
- State: Indiana
- County: Vigo
- Township: Otter Creek
- Elevation: 502 ft (153 m)
- Time zone: UTC-5 (Eastern (EST))
  - Summer (DST): UTC-4 (EDT)
- ZIP code: 47874
- Area code: 765
- GNIS feature ID: 438626

Markles is an unincorporated community in southern Otter Creek Township, Vigo County, in the U.S. state of Indiana. Within the boundaries of Terre Haute, it is also part of the Terre Haute metropolitan area.

The town is home to Markles Cemetery.

== Geography ==
Markles is located at 39°31′37″N 87°21′07″W at an elevation of 502 feet.
