= Charles G. Abrell =

United States Marine Corps Medal of Honor recipient

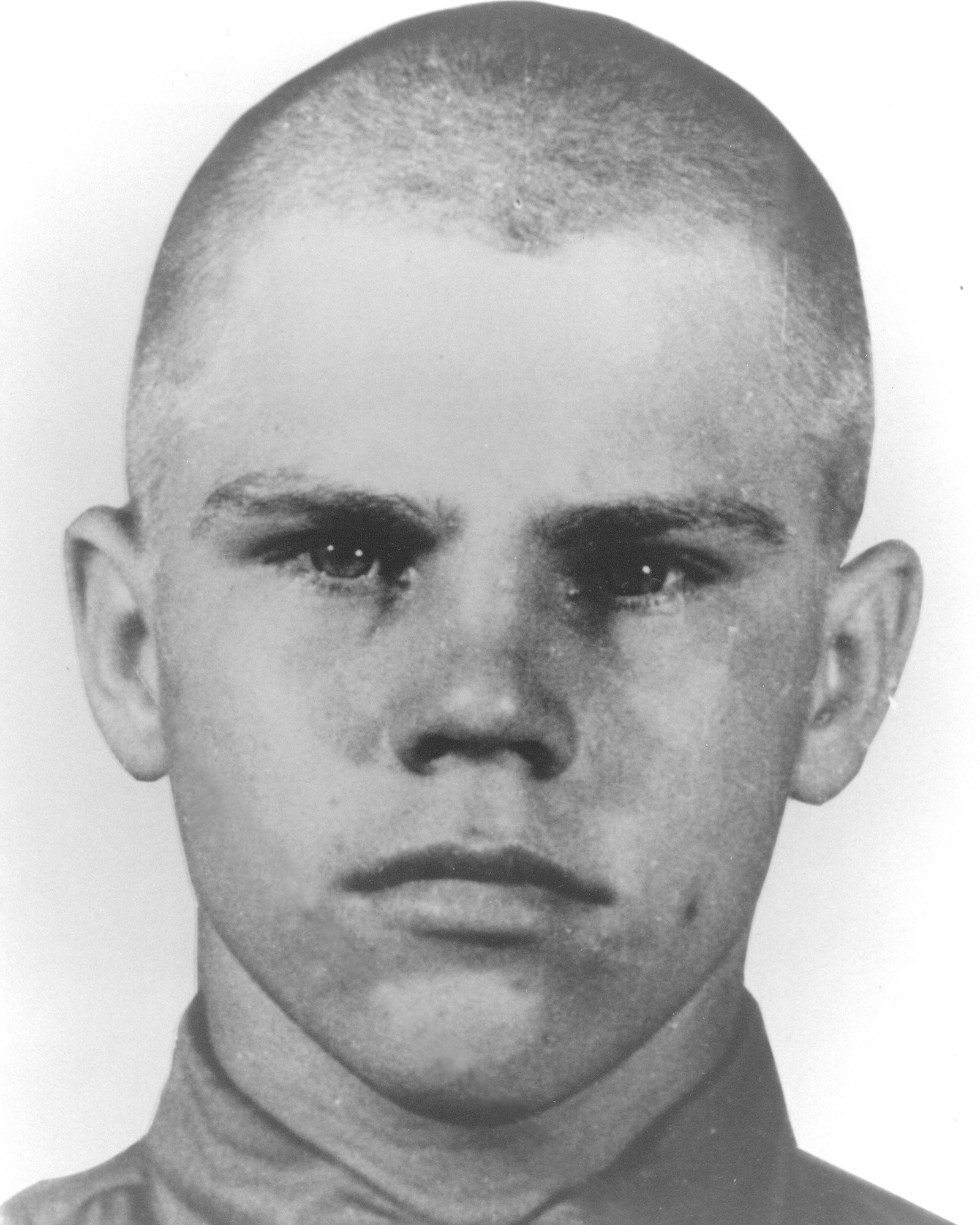
- Corporal Charles G. Abrell, U.S. Marine Corps, Medal of Honor recipient
- Born: August 12, 1931; Terre Haute, Indiana, US
- Died: June 10, 1951 (aged 19); Gangwon Province, Korea
- Burial place: Westlawn Cemetery, Farmersburg, Indiana
- Military career
- Allegiance: United States
- Branch: United States Marine Corps
- Service years: 1948–1951
- Rank: Corporal
- Units: Company E, 2nd Battalion, 1st Marines, 1st Marine Division
- Conflicts: Korean War: Battle of Inchon; UN September 1950 counteroffensive; Second Battle of Seoul; Second Phase Offensive; Battle of Chosin Reservoir; UN May–June 1951 counteroffensive (DOW)
- Awards: Medal of Honor; Purple Heart (2)

Charles Gene Abrell (August 12, 1931 – June 10, 1951) was a United States Marine Corps corporal who was posthumously awarded the Medal of Honor for his heroic actions during the UN May–June 1951 counteroffensive in the Korean War. After being wounded twice during a single-handed assault against an enemy bunker at Hwacheon, Abrell pulled the pin from a hand grenade and hurled himself into the bunker, killing the enemy gun crew and himself in the explosion.

== Early life ==
Charles Abrell was born in Terre Haute, Indiana in 1931. He attended public schools in Las Vegas, Nevada, and then enlisted in the United States Marine Corps on August 17, 1948, at age 17.

== U.S. Marine Corps ==
Following recruit training at Marine Corps Recruit Depot Parris Island, South Carolina, Abrell was assigned as a rifleman to Marine Corps Base Camp Lejeune, North Carolina. He deployed from San Diego on August 17, 1950, to Kobe, Japan at the beginning of the Korean War aboard the attack transport USS Noble (which was previously used for large scale amphibious training exercises with marines from Camp Lejeune) with the 1st Marine Regiment, 1st Marine Division, arriving on September 2. USS Noble departed Kobe on September 9 and arrived off South Korea four days later for the Inchon Invasion on September 15.

Abrell was in combat during the Battle of Inchon from September 15 to 19, 1950, at Seoul, Wonsan, Chosin Reservoir and Hamhung as a fire team leader with Company E, 2nd Battalion, 1st Marine Regiment, 1st Marine Division. He died during an assault on an enemy hill position at Hwachon in June 1951, for which Abrell was awarded the Medal of Honor. After being wounded twice during a single-handed assault against an enemy bunker, Abrell pulled the pin from a hand grenade and hurled himself into the bunker, killing the enemy gun crew and himself in the explosion.

== Military awards ==
Abrell's decorations and awards include:

1st row	Medal of Honor	Navy and Marine Corps Commendation Medal with Combat “V”	Purple Heart Medal with three 5/16" gold star
2nd row	Combat Action Ribbon	Presidential Unit Citation with two 3/16" bronze stars	Marine Corps Good Conduct Medal
3rd row	Navy Occupation Service Medal	National Defense Service Medal	Korean Service Medal with one 3/16 silver star
4th Row	Korean Presidential Unit Citation	United Nations Service Medal	Korean War Service Medal

=== Medal of Honor citation ===
Abrell's Medal of Honor citation reads:

The President of the United States in the name of the Congress takes pride in presenting the Medal of Honor posthumously to

CORPORAL CHARLES G. ABRELL
UNITED STATES MARINE CORPS for service as set forth in the following

CITATION:

For conspicuous gallantry and intrepidity at the risk of his life above and beyond the call of duty while serving as a fire team leader in Company E, in action against enemy aggressor forces. While advancing with his platoon in an attack against well-concealed and heavily fortified enemy hill positions, Cpl. Abrell voluntarily rushed forward through the assaulting squad which was pinned down by a hail of intense and accurate automatic-weapons fire from a hostile bunker situated on commanding ground. Although previously wounded by enemy hand grenade fragments, he proceeded to carry out a bold, single-handed attack against the bunker, exhorting his comrades to follow him. Sustaining 2 additional wounds as he stormed toward the emplacement, he resolutely pulled the pin from a grenade clutched in his hand and hurled himself bodily into the bunker with the live missile still in his grasp. Fatally wounded in the resulting explosion which killed the entire enemy guncrew within the stronghold, Cpl. Abrell, by his valiant spirit of self-sacrifice in the face of certain death, served to inspire all his comrades and contributed directly to the success of his platoon in attaining its objective. His superb courage and heroic initiative sustain and enhance the highest traditions of the U.S. Naval Service. He gallantly gave his life for his country.

Harry S. Truman

== In memory ==
In 1982, the Indiana Historical Bureau placed a historical marker in northern Terre Haute commemorating Abrell; it is one of 12 markers in Vigo County.

In June 2001, a life-sized bronze statue of Charles Abrell on the grounds of the Vigo County Courthouse, Indiana, was dedicated in honor of those who served in Korea.

== See also ==
- List of Korean War Medal of Honor recipients
