= Terre Haute Masonic Temple =

- U.S. National Register of Historic Places
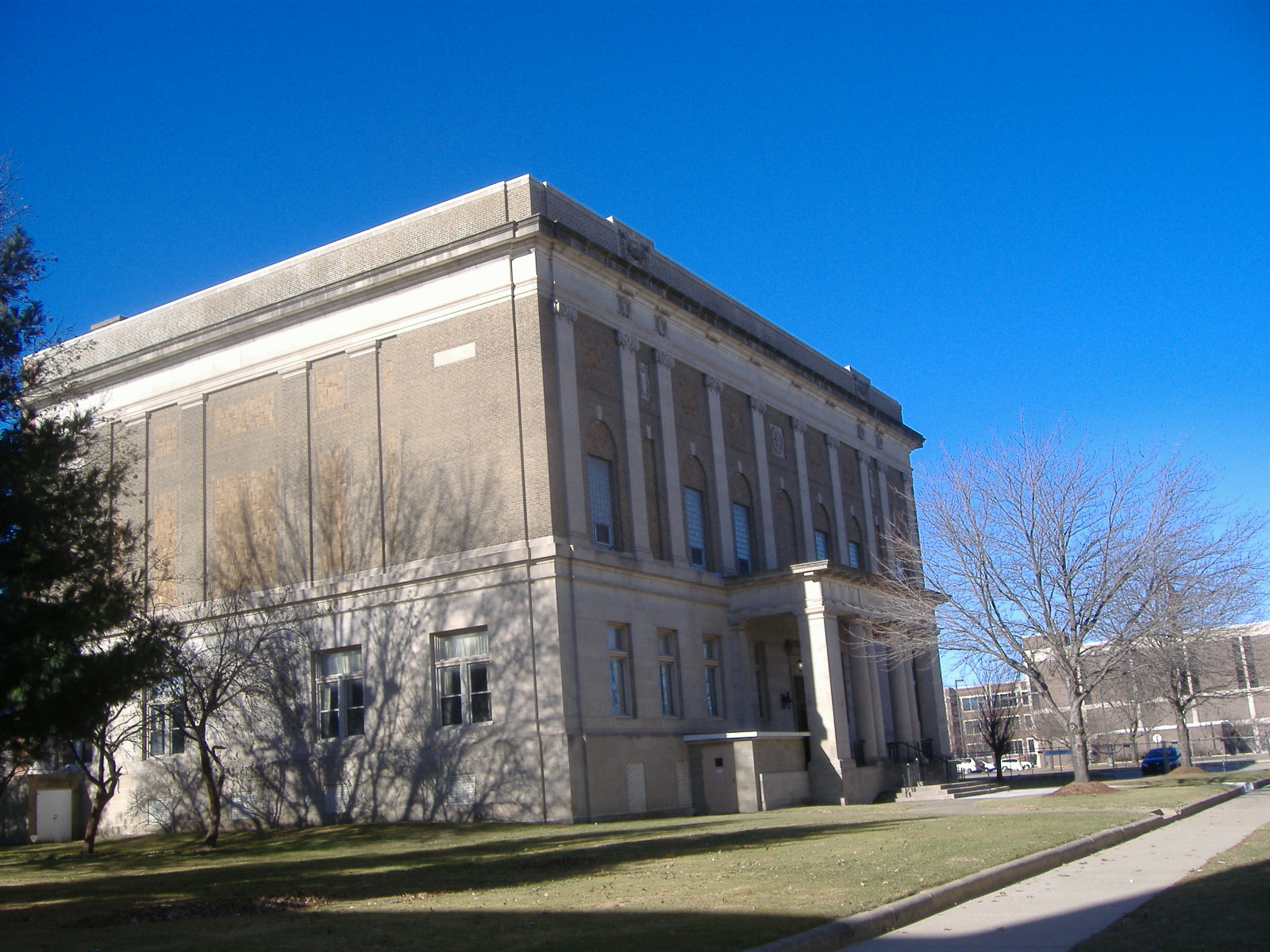
- Terre Haute Masonic Temple, in Terre Haute, Indiana.

- Location within Vigo County, Indiana Location within Indiana Location within the United States
- Location: 224 N. Eighth St., Terre Haute, Indiana
- Coordinates: 39°28′9″N 87°24′22″W
- Area: less than one acre
- Built: 1916
- Architect: Hubbard, Archie H.; Stoolman, A. W.
- Architectural style: Classical Revival
- Website: http://www.terrehautemasonictemple.com/
- NRHP reference No.: 95000705
- Added to NRHP: June 9, 1995

The Terre Haute Masonic Temple in Terre Haute, Indiana is a Classical Revival-style Masonic building that ground was broken for in 1915, cornerstone was laid in 1916, and opened in 1917. It was listed on the National Register of Historic Places by the United States Department of the Interior in 1995. The structure was commissioned by the Terre Haute Masonic Temple Association which was included one director from each of the following bodies that funded the building of the temple: Social Lodge No. 86 F&AM, Humboldt Lodge No. 42 F&AM, Terre Haute Lodge #19 F&AM, Euclid Lodge No. 573 F&AM, Terre Haute Chapter No. 11 R.A.M., Terre Haute Council No. 8 R. & S.M., Terre Haute Commandery No. 16 K.T. The Temple was built by A.W. Stoolman with Archie H. Hubbard serving as architect.

The Terre Haute Masonic Temple is currently utilized by Social Lodge No. 86 F&AM, Terre Haute Lodge #19 F&AM, Humboldt Lodge No. 42 F&AM, Terre Haute Chapter No. 11 R.A.M., Terre Haute Council No. 8 R. & S.M., Terre Haute Commandery No. 16 K.T., Job's Daughters Bethel No. 2, Terre Haute Chapter No. 43 Order of the Eastern Star, Terre Haute Order of Amaranth. The building was previously used by Euclid No. 573 F&AM, The Order of the White Shrine of Jerusalem and The Order of Demolay.

The governing body of the building that is responsible for all modifications and maintenance is the Terre Haute Masonic Temple Association which still includes six of the original seven bodies that erected the structure (Euclid No. 573 is no longer in existence). The board is composed of a President, Vice President, Secretary & Treasurer, and three other members.

The building is a total of four stories tall with an additional full basement. The foundation of the building was initially constructed to support the weight of a twelve-story building. The first floor is the dedicated public floor and contains the ballroom, library, parlor, board room, office, card room, and ladies and gentleman's cloak rooms and rest rooms. The second floor is dedicated to the Blue Lodge and Order of the Eastern Star and houses three lodge rooms, rest rooms and lounge area. The third floor is dedicated to the three bodies of the York Rite: The Chapter of Royal Arch Masons, Council of Royal & Secret Masters, and Commandery of Knights Templar. The fourth floor contains storage and a choir and organ loft.

== Gallery ==
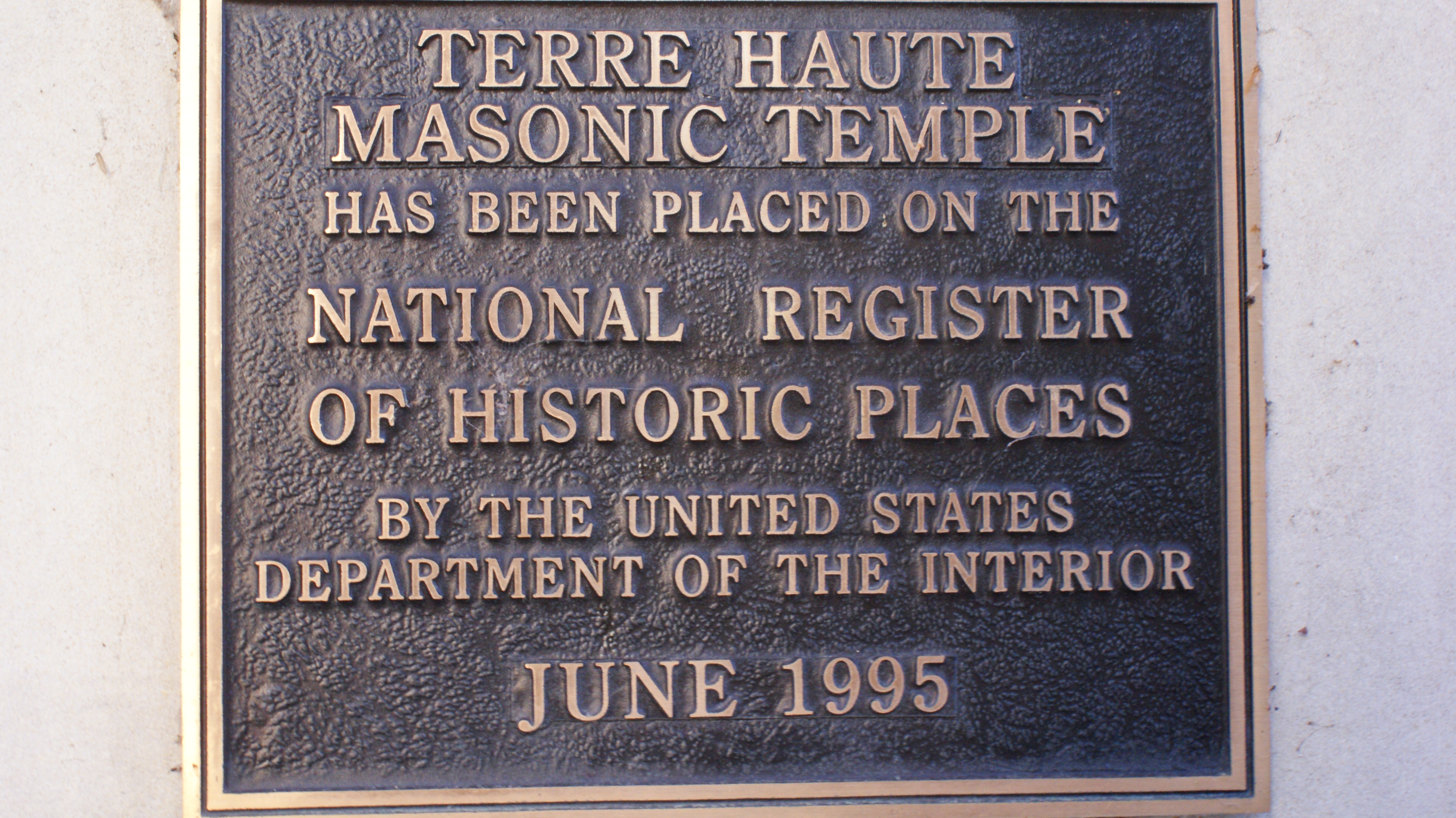
National Register of Historic Places 1995

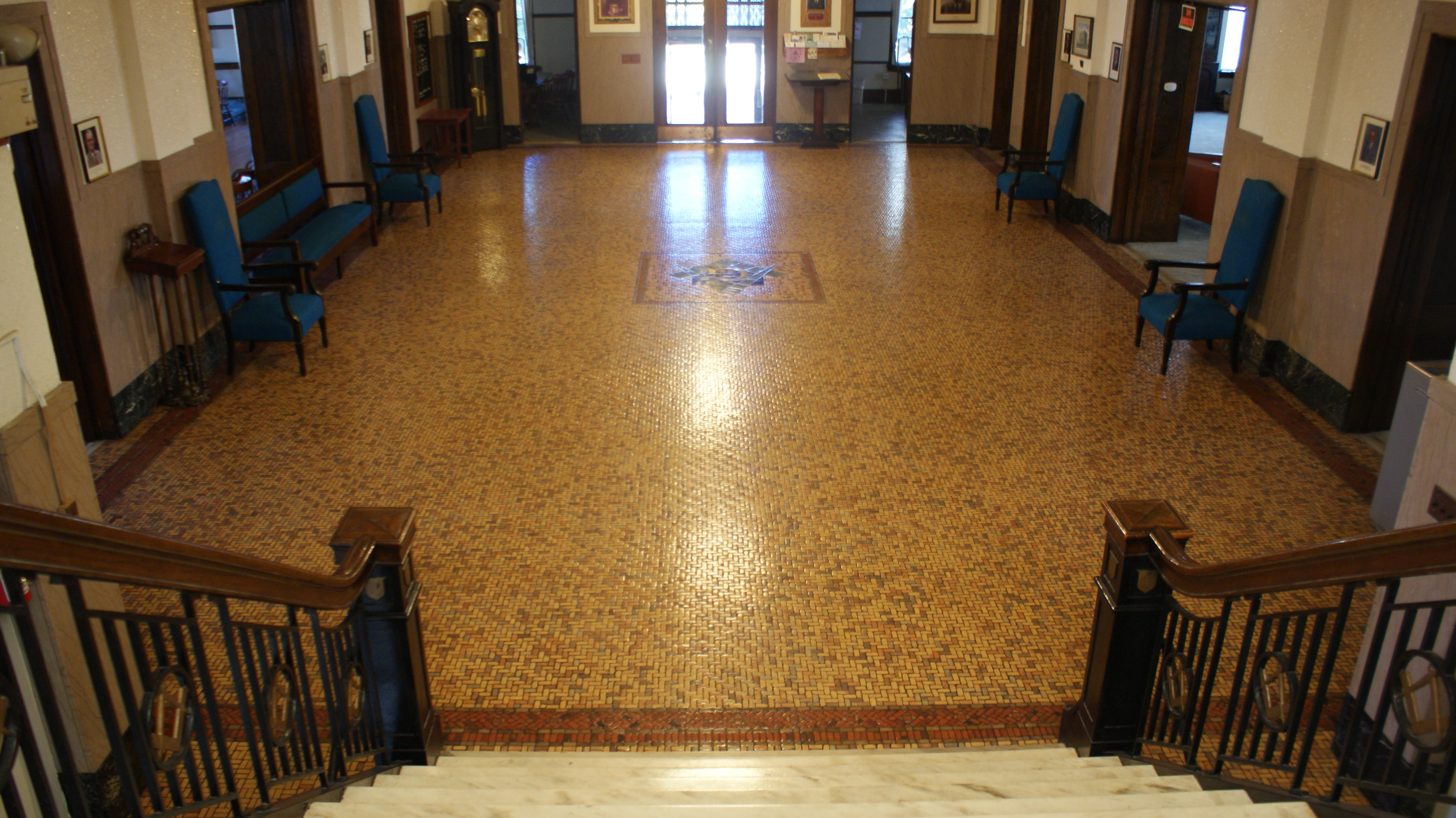
Terre Haute Masonic Temple Boulevard

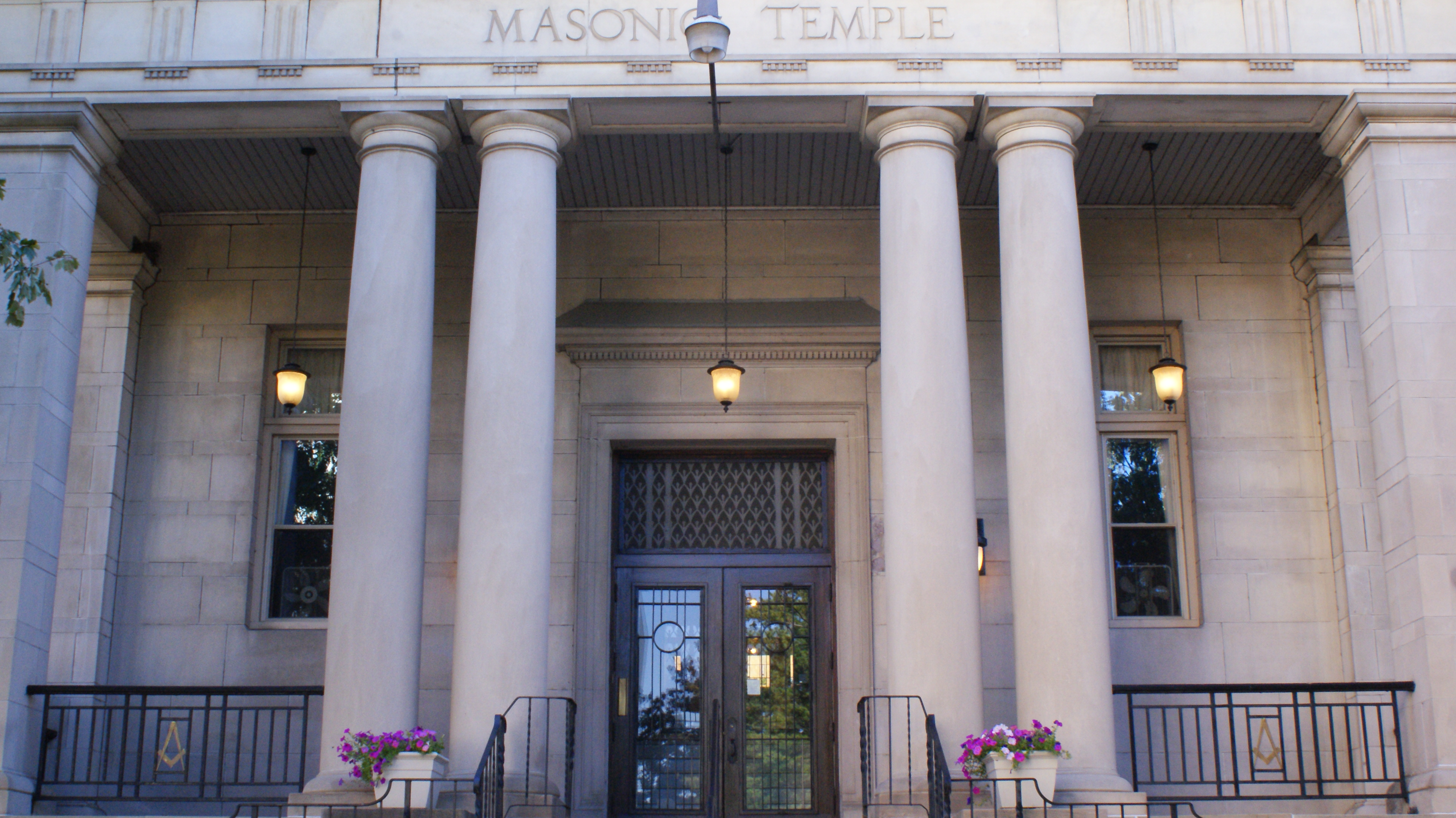
Front of Terre Haute Masonic Temple

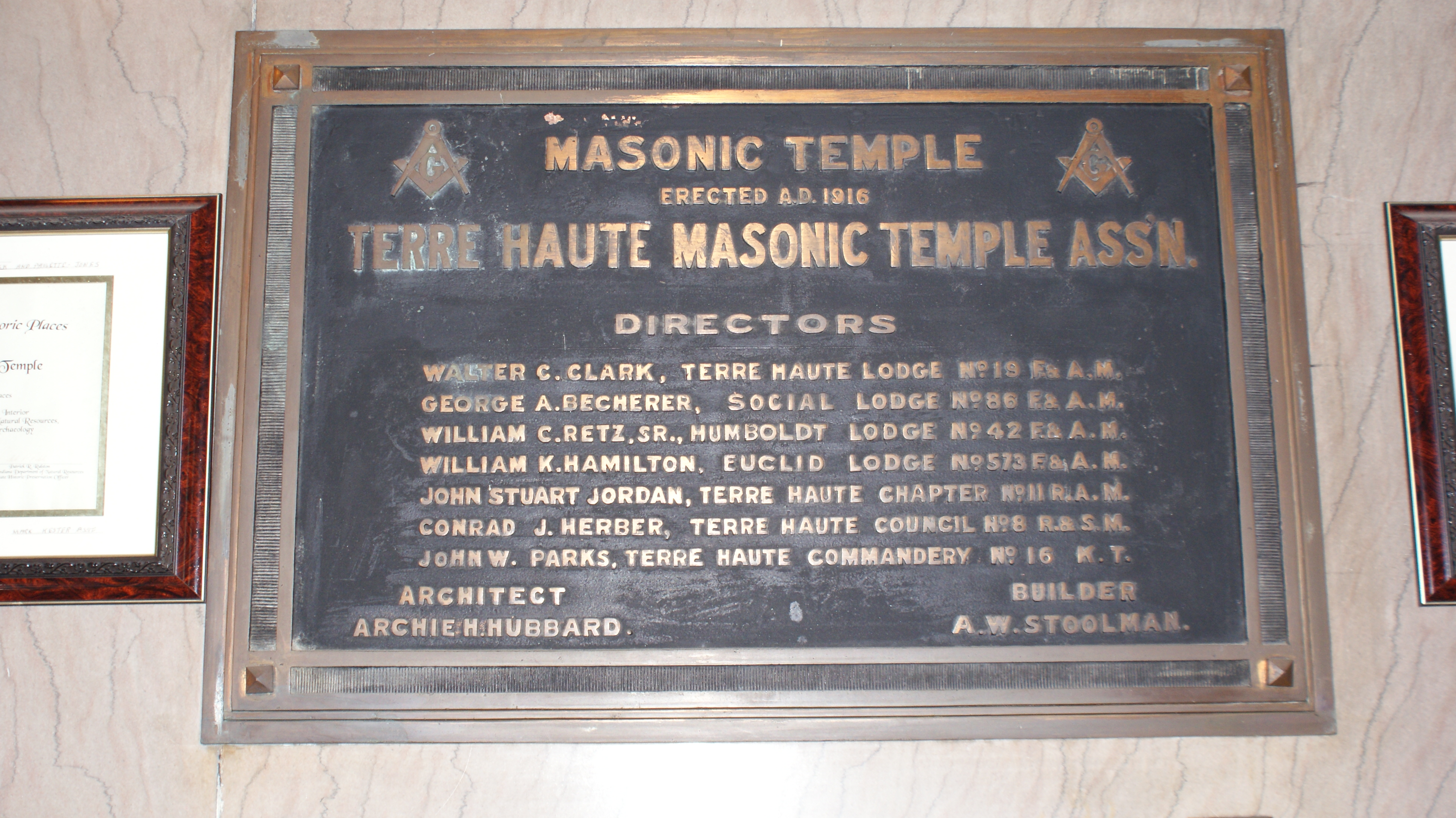
1916 Temple Association Directors

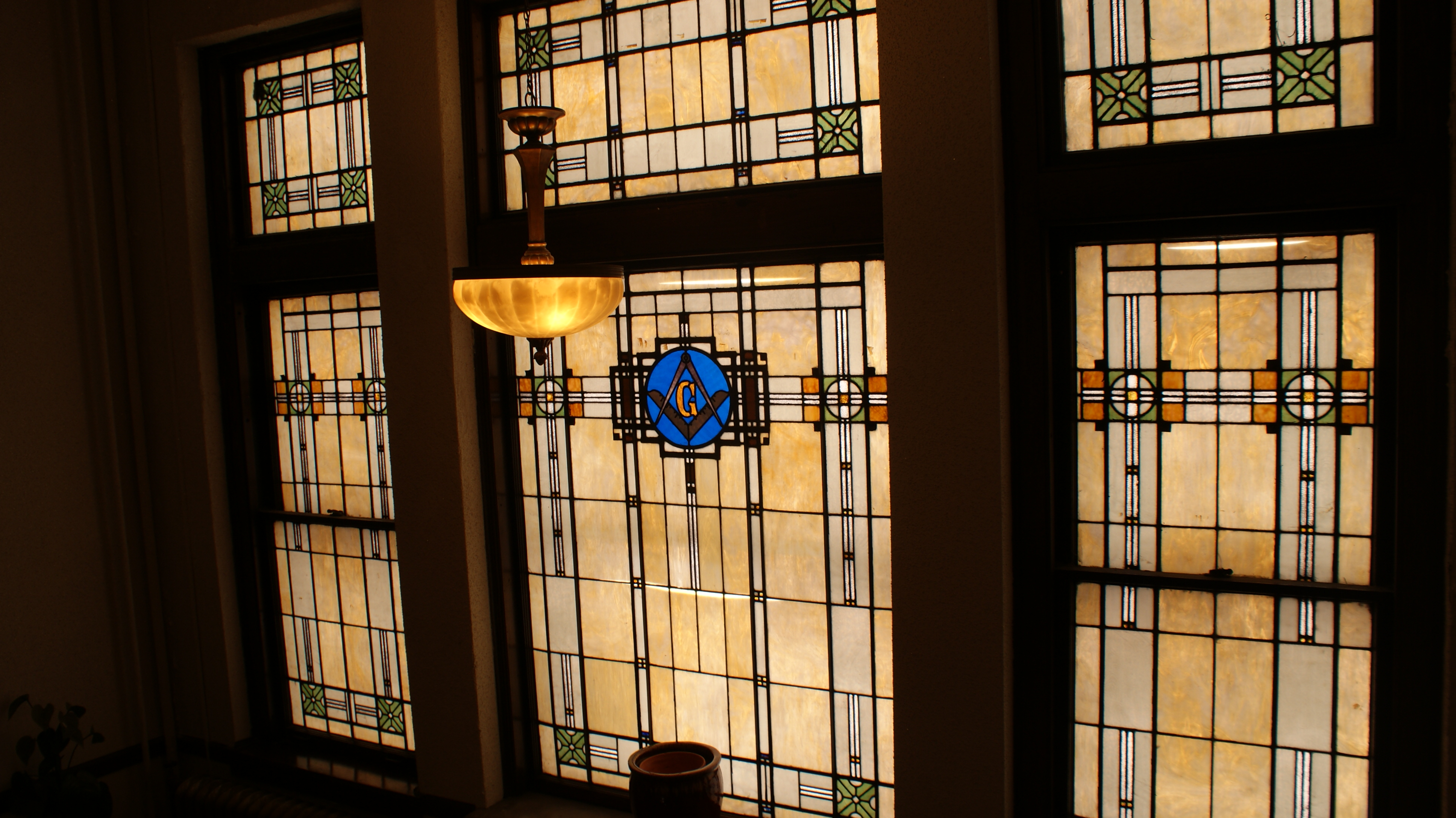
Second Floor Stained Glass Windows

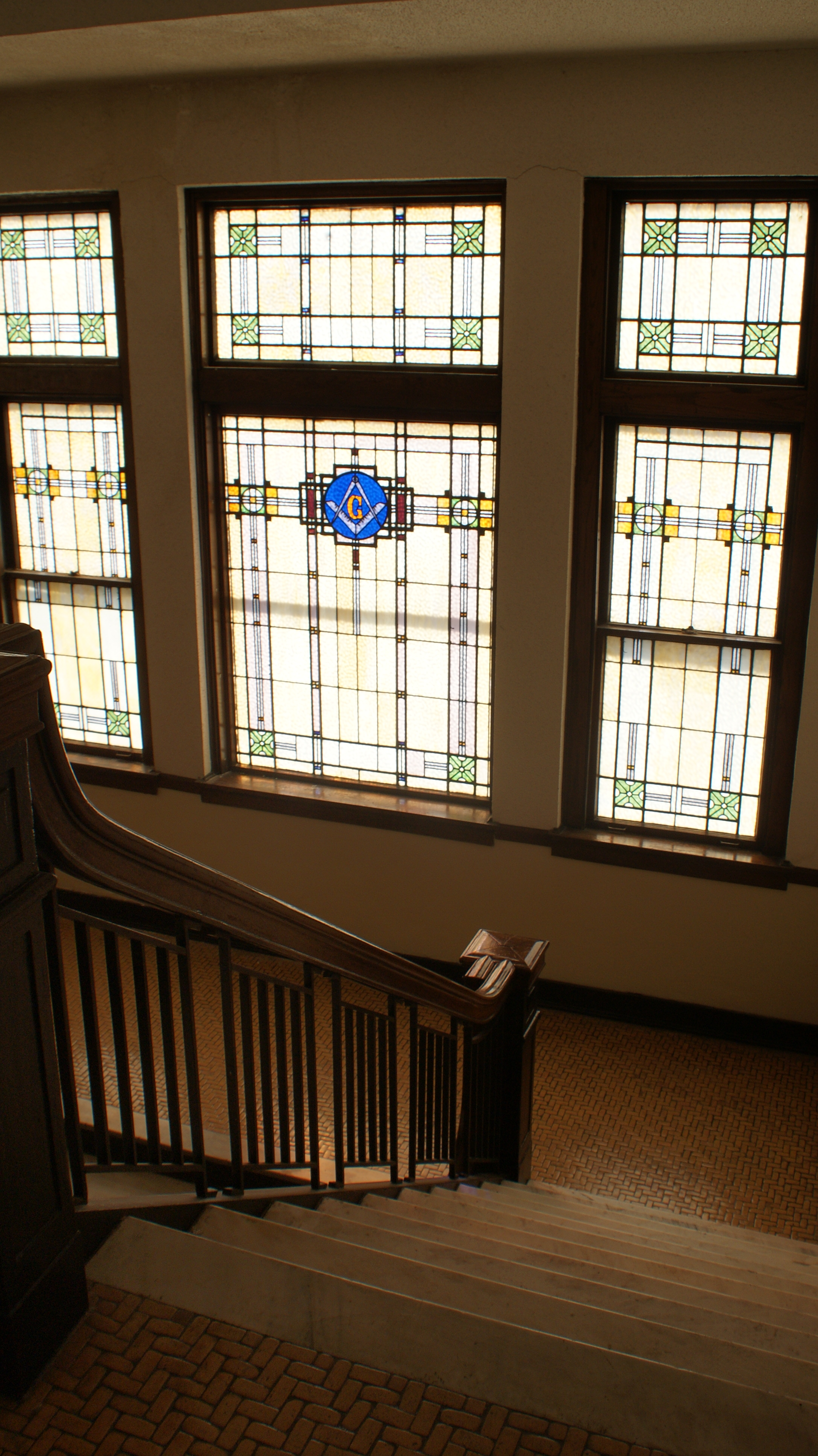
Third Floor Stained Glass Windows

== See also ==
- List of Masonic buildings in Indiana
- National Register of Historic Places listings in Vigo County, Indiana
