= Otter Creek Junction, Indiana =

- Unincorporated community
- Vigo County's location in Indiana

- location in Vigo County, Indiana
- Coordinates: 39°32′47″N 87°20′54″W
- Country: United States
- State: Indiana
- County: Vigo
- Township: Otter Creek
- Elevation: 502 ft (153 m)
- Time zone: UTC-5 (Eastern (EST))
  - Summer (DST): UTC-4 (EDT)
- ZIP code: 47805
- Area codes: 812, 930
- GNIS feature ID: 440746

Otter Creek Junction is an unincorporated community in Otter Creek Township, Vigo County, in the U.S. state of Indiana.

It is part of the Terre Haute metropolitan area.

== History ==
Otter Creek Junction was originally built at a flag station on the C. & E. I. Rail Road. The community takes its name from the nearby Otter Creek.

== Geography ==
Otter Creek Junction is located at 39°32′47″N 87°20′54″W at an elevation of 502 feet.
