= Collett Park =

- U.S. National Register of Historic Places
- U.S. Historic district
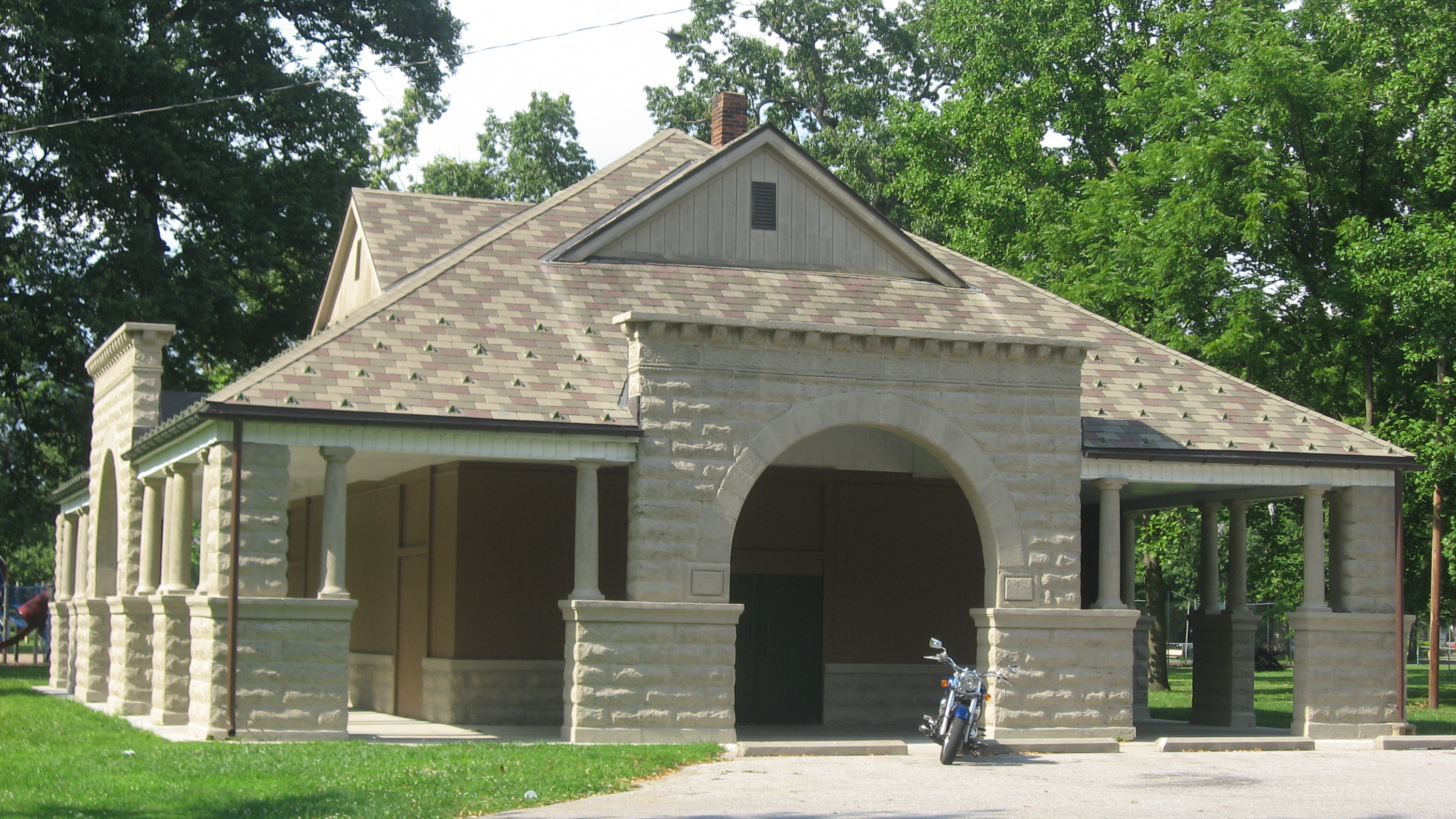
- Pavilion in the park

- Location within Vigo County, Indiana Location within Indiana Location within the United States
- Location: North 7th St. and Maple Ave., Terre Haute, Indiana; United States
- Coordinates: 39°29′38″N 87°24′21″W
- Architect: J. Merrill Sherman
- Architectural style: Romanesque Revival
- NRHP reference No.: 81000021
- Added to NRHP: December 10, 1981

Collett Park is a public park in Terre Haute, Indiana, United States.

The park was established in 1883 on a parcel of land donated to the city of Terre Haute by Josephus Collett, a railroad magnate and philanthropist. Its 21 acres (85,000 m^{2}) of tree-filled park land are approximately two miles north of downtown Terre Haute. A Romanesque Revival pavilion was built in 1894 by architect J. Merrill Sherman.

The park's large main building with an indoor rental facility as well as outdoor shelters and restrooms. There are also football and soccer fields, a playground, horseshoe pits and tennis courts.

Collett Park was placed on the National Register of Historic Places in 1981 for its historical significance in entertainment and recreation. The neighborhood that arose around the park, now known as the Collett Park Neighborhood Historic District, was placed on the Register itself in 2004.
