= Building at 510–516 Ohio Street =

- U.S. National Register of Historic Places
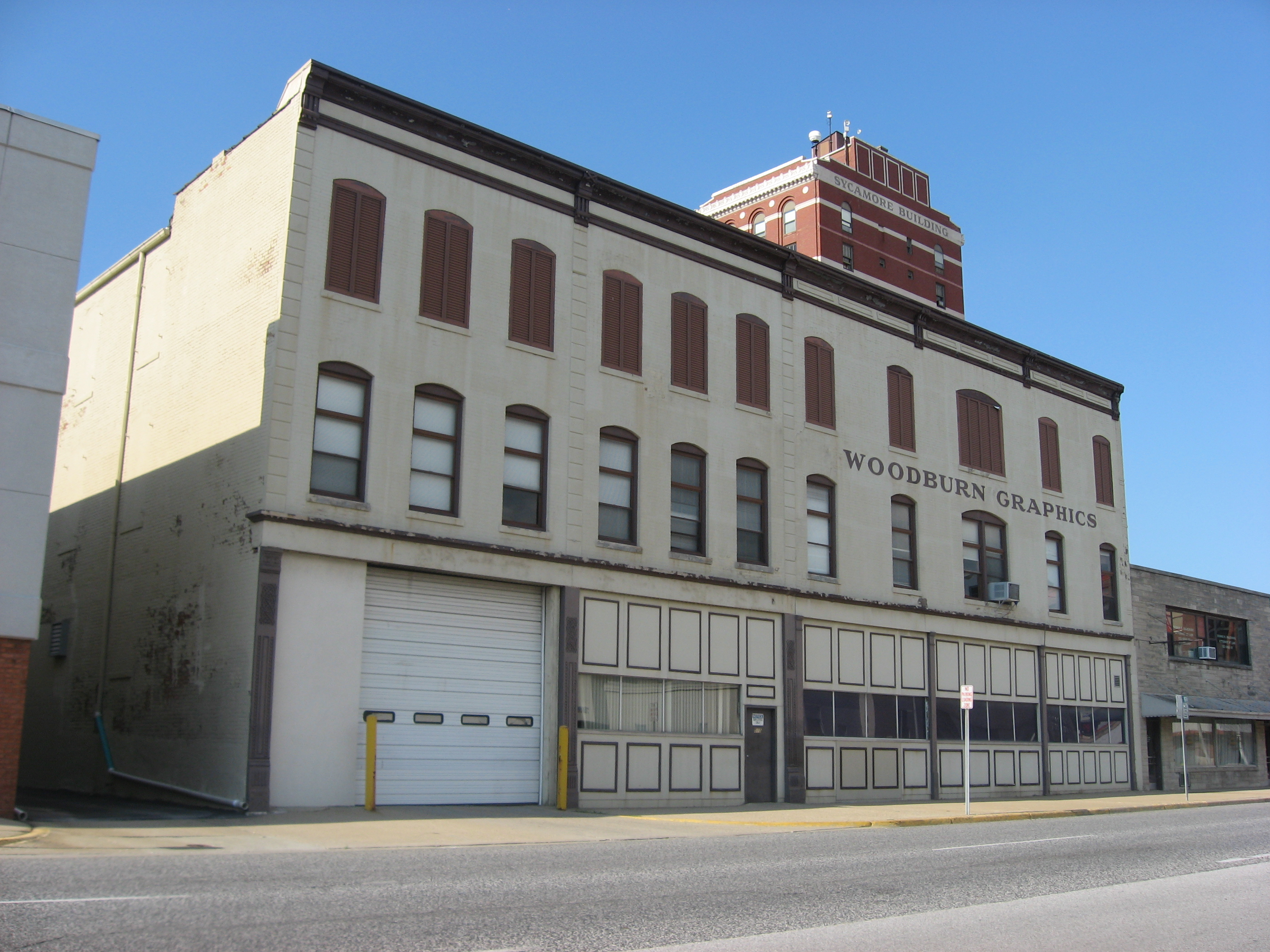
- Building at 510–516 Ohio Street, July 2011

- Location within Vigo County, Indiana Location within Indiana Location within the United States
- Location: 510–516 Ohio St., Terre Haute, Indiana
- Coordinates: 39°27′57″N 87°24′39″W
- Area: less than one acre
- Built: 1891–1892
- Architectural style: Italianate
- MPS: Downtown Terre Haute MRA
- NRHP reference No.: 83000152
- Added to NRHP: June 30, 1983

510–516 Ohio Street is a historic commercial building located at Terre Haute, Indiana. It was built in 1891–1892, and is a three-story, rectangular, Italianate style brick building. It features stone, cast iron, and pressed metal decorative elements. It was renovated in 1975.

It was listed on the National Register of Historic Places on June 30, 1983.
