= Butternut Hill =

Historic house in Indiana, United States

- U.S. National Register of Historic Places
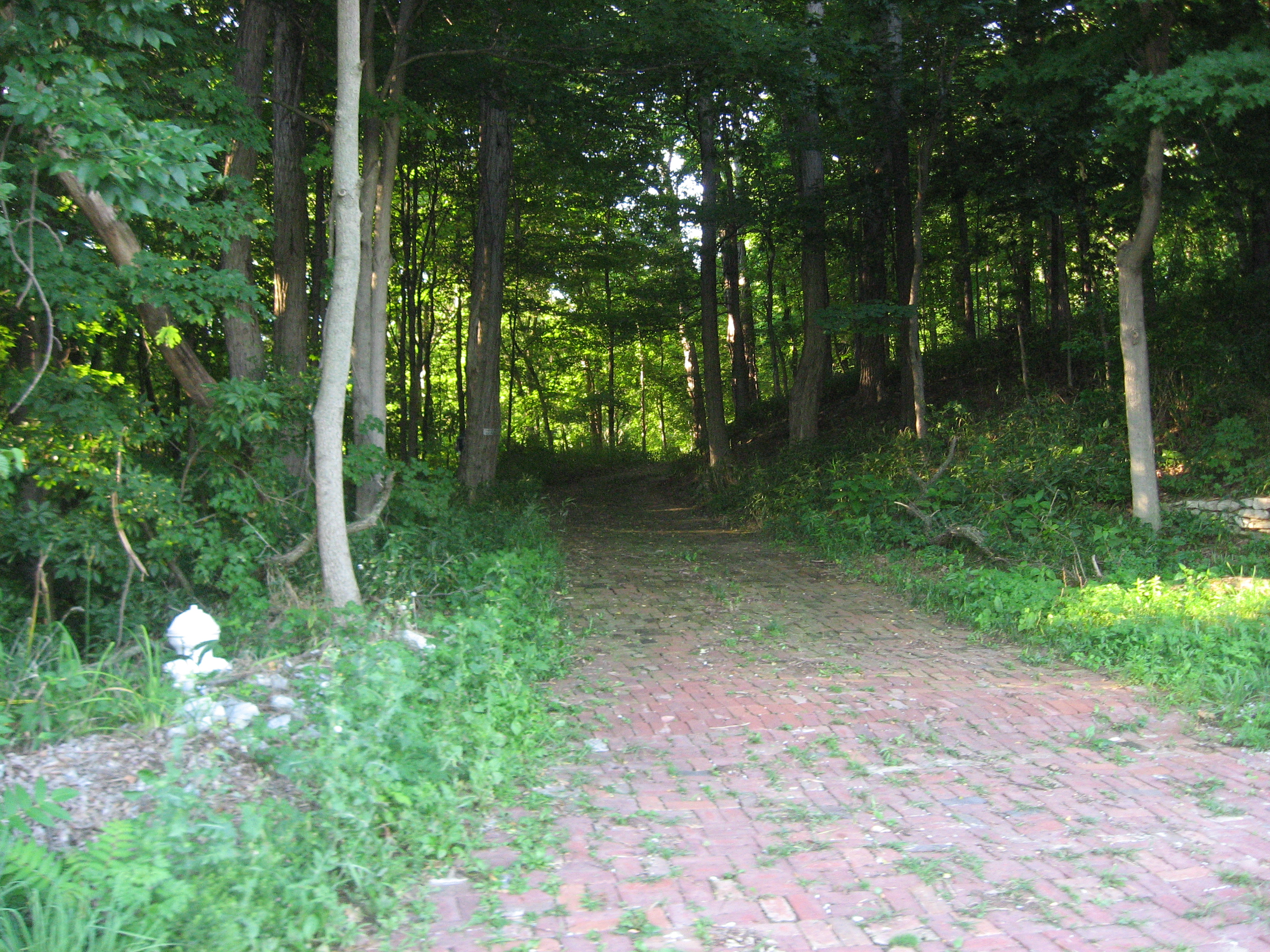
- Butternut Hill driveway, July 2011

- Location within Vigo County, Indiana Location within Indiana Location within the United States
- Location: 4430 Wabash Ave., Terre Haute, Indiana
- Coordinates: 39°28′33″N 87°21′7″W
- Area: less than one acre
- Built: c. 1835, 1869, 1902
- Architectural style: Greek Revival, Vernacular, central passage
- NRHP reference No.: 93000469
- Added to NRHP: May 27, 1993

Butternut Hill, also known as Prospect Hill, Blake House, and Ross House, is a historic home located at Terre Haute, Indiana. It was built about 1835, and enlarged in 1869 and 1902. It is a two-story, central passage plan, vernacular Greek Revival style brick dwelling.

It was listed on the National Register of Historic Places in 1993.
