= Hungarian Community (Terre Haute) =

Ethnic community in Indiana, United States

The Hungarian Community is a historic ethnic community established in Terre Haute, Indiana, United States, at the beginning of the 20th century and is still present today.

== History ==
At the beginning of the 20th century, Hungarians came to Terre Haute in search of employment and other opportunities, and they established a thriving community.

Between 1880 and 1920, a large number of Hungarians emigrated to the United States in search of employment in the rapidly industrializing country. Around 14,000 Hungarian immigrants had made Indiana their home by 1910; of them, just over 450 were in Vigo County.

== Legacy ==
In 2023, the first marker in the state to specifically highlight Hungarian history and its contributions to Indiana was installed in Terre Haute by the Indiana Historical Bureau in collaboration with the current Hungarian community, William G. Pomeroy Foundation, and the Grandchildren of Frank and Julia Koos.
