= Wabash Avenue–West Historic District =

Historic district in Indiana, United States

- U.S. National Register of Historic Places
- U.S. Historic district
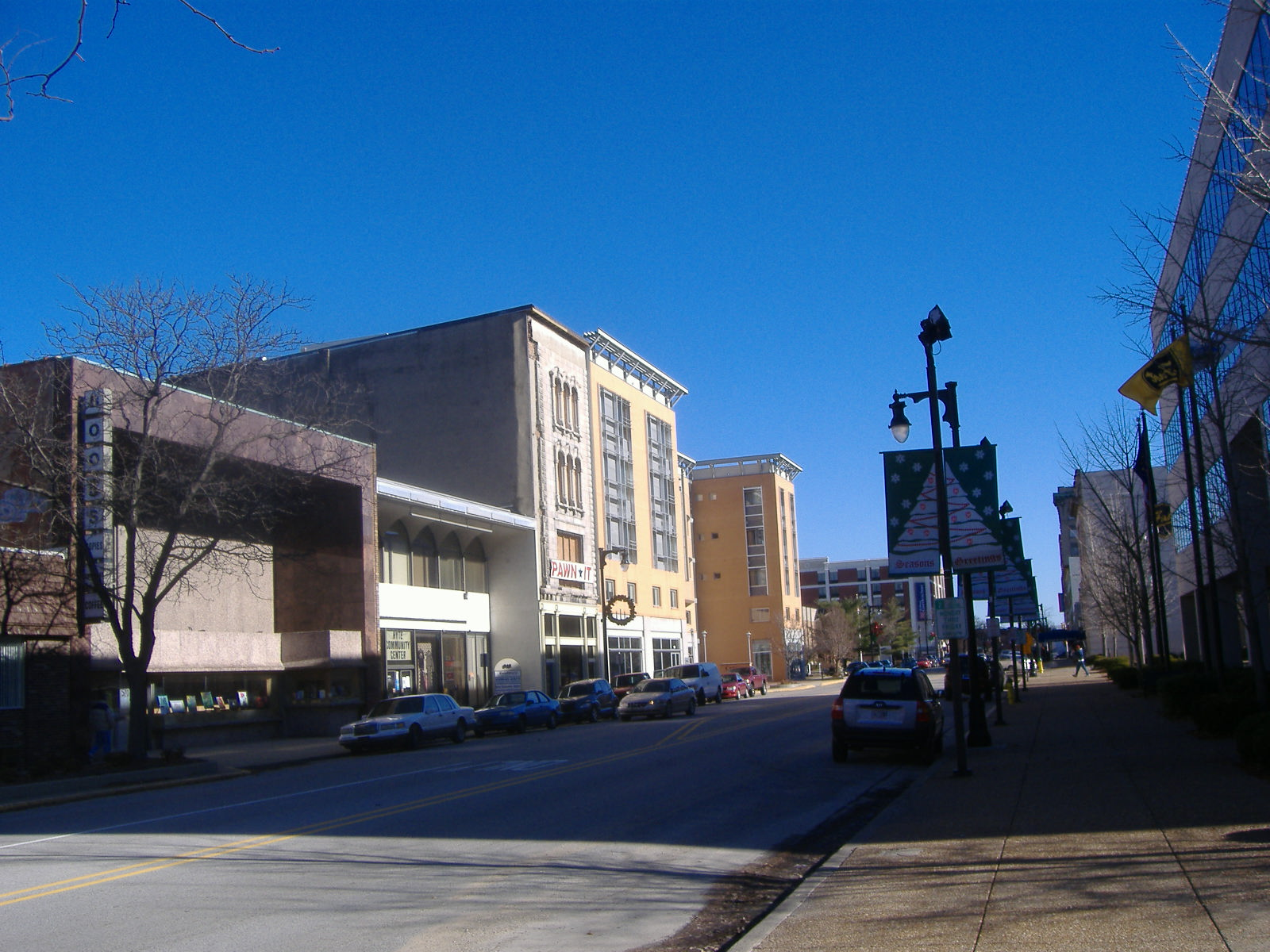
- 600 Block Wabash Avenue, December 2008

- Location within Vigo County, Indiana Location within Indiana Location within the United States
- Location: Wabash Ave. and 6th St., Terre Haute, Indiana
- Coordinates: 39°28′00″N 87°24′39″W
- Area: 6 acres (2.4 ha)
- Built: 1870
- Architect: Multiple
- Architectural style: Renaissance, Romanesque, Italianate
- MPS: Downtown Terre Haute MRA
- NRHP reference No.: 83000041
- Added to NRHP: June 30, 1983

Wabash Avenue–West Historic District is a national historic district located at Terre Haute, Indiana. It encompasses 24 contributing buildings in the central business district of Terre Haute. It developed after 1870 and includes representative examples of Italianate, Romanesque Revival, and Renaissance Revival style architecture. Notable buildings include 408 Wabash Avenue (c. 1870), 425-431 Wabash Avenue (1867–1868), the White Block (1899), The Albrecht Building (1893), 522 Wabash Avenue (1890), 524 Wabash Avenue (c. 1890), Koopman Building (1875), Blumberg Building (1915), and the Hotel Deming (1914).

It was listed on the National Register of Historic Places in 1983.
