= Eugene V. Debs Home =

Historic house in Indiana, United States

- Eugene V. Debs House
- U.S. National Register of Historic Places
- U.S. National Historic Landmark
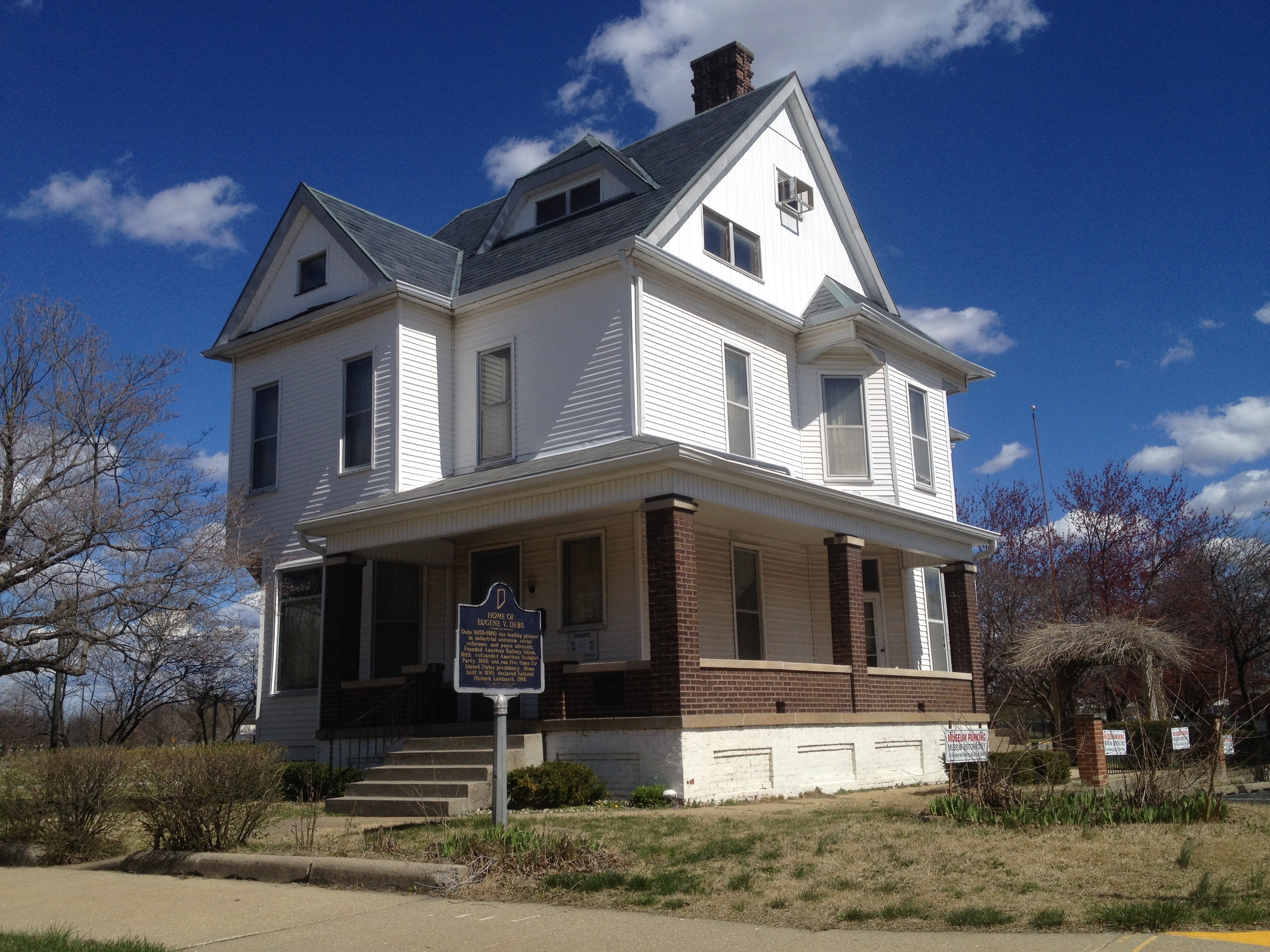
- Southwest view

- Location within Vigo County, Indiana Location within Indiana Location within the United States
- Location: 451 N. 8th St., Terre Haute, Indiana
- Coordinates: 39°28′18.7″N 87°24′19.7″W
- Built: 1890
- NRHP reference No.: 66000008

Significant dates
- Added to NRHP: November 13, 1966
- Designated NHL: November 13, 1966

The Eugene V. Debs House is an historic home in Terre Haute, Indiana. Now located on the campus of Indiana State University, it was a home of presidential candidate and union leader Eugene V. Debs. It was declared a National Historic Landmark in 1966. The museum is maintained by the Eugene V. Debs Foundation, a non-profit educational foundation.

Eugene V. Debs and his wife, Kate, built the two-story frame house in 1890, after their fifth wedding anniversary. Debs was criticized for the house not portraying working-class lifestyle; his wife was a beneficiary of her wealthy aunt's will and could furnish the house affluently. Visitors to Debs' house during his lifetime included friends James Whitcomb Riley and Carl Sandburg; one room in the house to this day is known as the Riley bedroom. When Debs died in 1926, a funeral sermon was given for him at the house, attended by 5000 people.

Original features of the house include the cobalt blue porcelain tile fireplace imported from Italy, the mahogany dining and parlor furniture, and the entire set of Haviland china. The house is also a museum, with many memorabilia of Debs' life and some of his personal library, much of which is across the street at the library of Indiana State University. One room is covered by murals depicting Debs' life.

After Debs' death, the house had several different owners. One was a professor at Indiana State University. It was used as the Theta Chi fraternity house from 1948 to 1961, and briefly was let as apartments. In 1962, the home was bought by the Eugene V. Debs Foundation, which continues to own the house. In 1965, it was made an official Indiana historic site by the Indiana General Assembly. In 1966, the home was made an official National Historic Landmark of the National Parks system of the Department of the Interior . In 2004, it was removed from threatened status after sufficient repairs to the structure occurred to ensure its permanence. Today, the preservation of the property is monitored by the National Park Service.

== See also ==
- List of museums in Indiana
- List of National Historic Landmarks in Indiana
- National Register of Historic Places listings in Vigo County, Indiana
