= Building at 810 Wabash Avenue =

- U.S. National Register of Historic Places
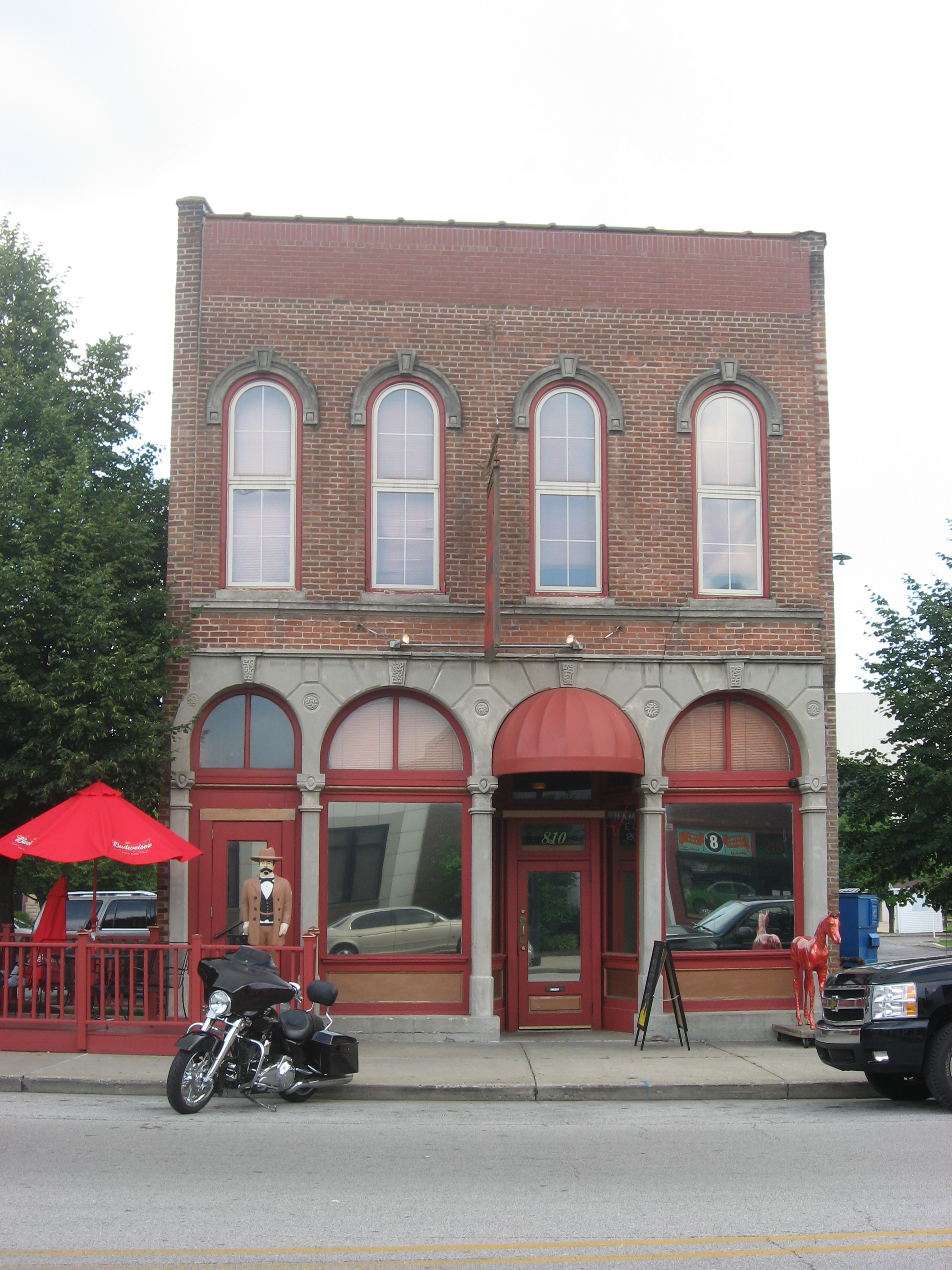
- Building at 810 Wabash Avenue, July 2011

- Location within Vigo County, Indiana Location within Indiana Location within the United States
- Location: 810 Wabash Ave., Terre Haute, Indiana
- Coordinates: 39°28′0″N 87°24′19″W
- Area: less than one acre
- Built: c. 1870
- Architectural style: Italianate
- MPS: Downtown Terre Haute MRA
- NRHP reference No.: 83000153
- Added to NRHP: June 30, 1983

Building at 810 Wabash Avenue is a historic commercial building located at Terre Haute, Indiana. It was built about 1870, and is a two-story, rectangular, Italianate style brick building. It features an elaborate cast iron storefront on the first story and round arched windows on the second.

It was listed on the National Register of Historic Places in 1983.
