= Star Building =

- U.S. National Register of Historic Places
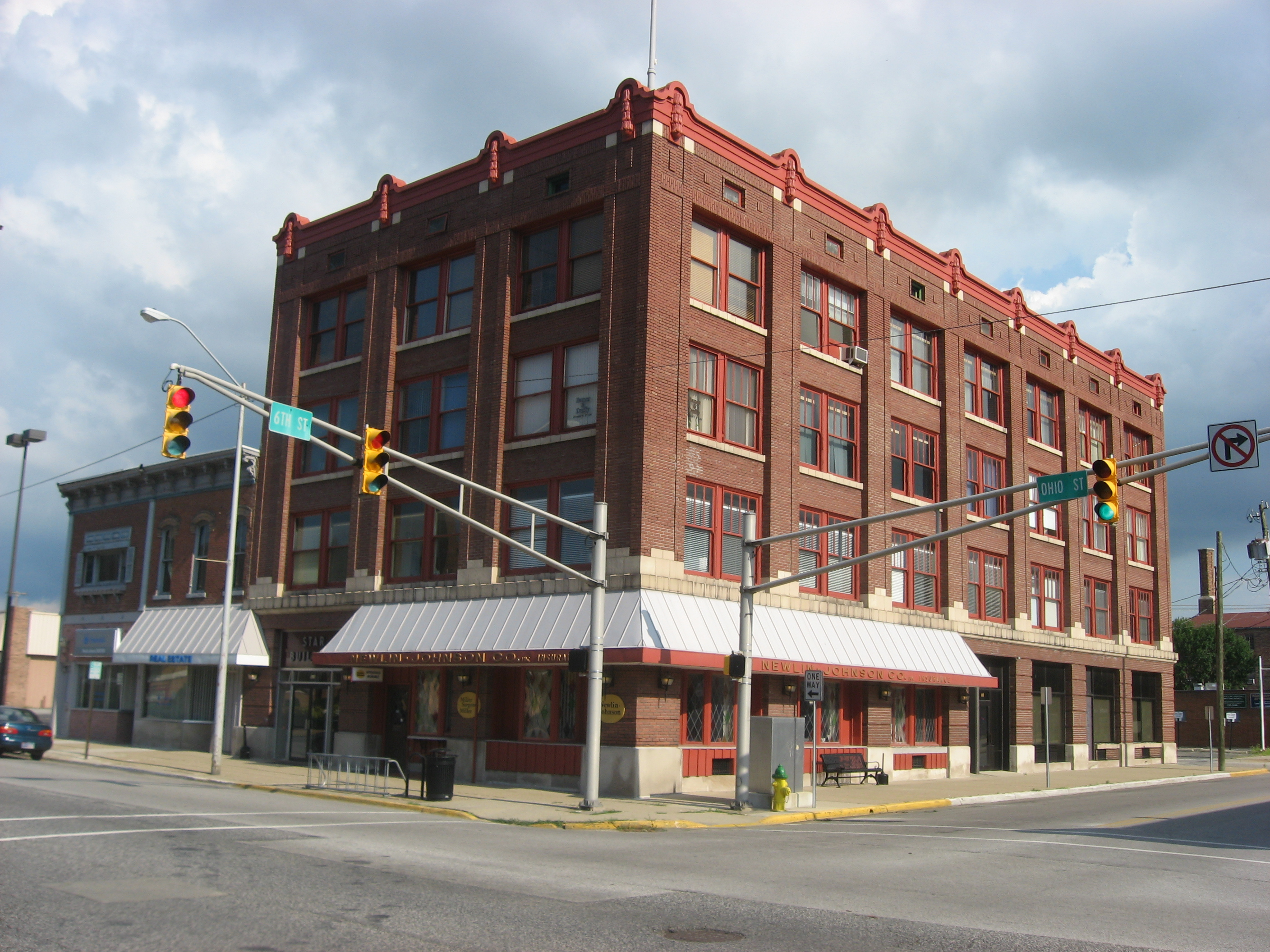
- Star Building, July 2011

- Location within Vigo County, Indiana Location within Indiana Location within the United States
- Location: 601-603 Ohio St., Terre Haute, Indiana
- Coordinates: 39°27′55″N 87°24′35″W
- Area: less than one acre
- Built: 1912
- Architectural style: Chicago
- MPS: Downtown Terre Haute MRA
- NRHP reference No.: 83000158
- Added to NRHP: June 30, 1983

Star Building is a historic commercial building located at Terre Haute, Indiana. It was built in 1912, and is a four-story, Chicago school style brick building. It features limestone and terra cotta detailing and a pressed metal decorative cornice. The building was built to house the Terre Haute Star newspaper.

It was listed on the National Register of Historic Places in 1983.
