= Markle House and Mill Site =

Historic house in Indiana, United States

- U.S. National Register of Historic Places
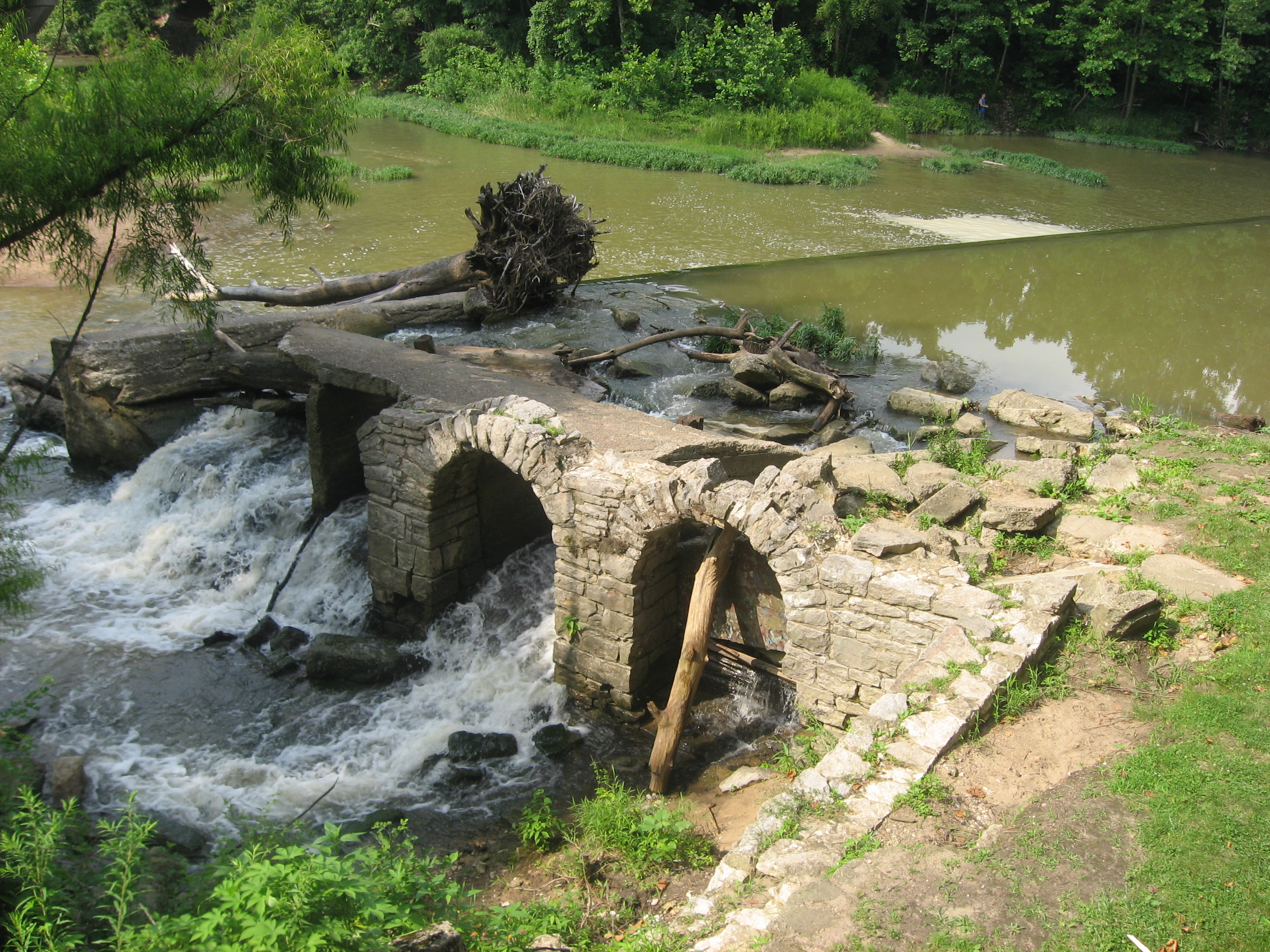
- Markle Mill site, July 2011

- Location within Vigo County, Indiana Location within Indiana Location within the United States
- Location: 4900 Mill Dam Rd. at North Terre Haute, Indiana
- Coordinates: 39°31′38″N 87°20′48″W
- Area: 9 acres (3.6 ha)
- Built: 1817, 1848
- Architectural style: Greek Revival, Italianate
- NRHP reference No.: 79000023
- Added to NRHP: September 10, 1979

Markle House and Mill Site is a historic home and site of Markle's Mill located in Otter Creek Township, Vigo County, Indiana. The house was built in 1848, and is a two-story, Greek Revival style painted brick dwelling with Italianate style influences. It has a one-story, front porch with Doric order columns. The Markle's Mill burned in 1938, and the remains consist of stone and concrete foundations and the associated remains of the dam. Also on the property are the contributing outhouse and carriage house.

It was listed on the National Register of Historic Places in 1979.

Vigo county commissioners plan to tear down dam site in September 2023.
