= Otter Creek Township, Vigo County, Indiana =

Otter Creek Township
- Township
- Location in Vigo County
- Coordinates: 39°33′43″N 87°20′53″W
- Country: United States
- State: Indiana
- County: Vigo

Government
  - Type: Indiana township

Area
  - Total: 35.61 sq mi (92.2 km^{2})
  - Land: 35.24 sq mi (91.3 km^{2})
  - Water: 0.37 sq mi (0.96 km^{2}) 1.04%
- Elevation: 509 ft (155 m)

Population (2020)
  - Total: 9,012
  - Density: 257.3/sq mi (99.3/km^{2})
- Time zone: UTC-5 (Eastern (EST))
  - Summer (DST): UTC-4 (EDT)
- ZIP codes: 47805, 47874
- GNIS feature ID: 453699

Otter Creek Township is one of twelve townships in Vigo County, Indiana, United States. As of the 2010 census, its population was 9,069 and it contained 3,917 housing units.

== History ==
Markle House and Mill Site was listed on the National Register of Historic Places in 1979.

== Geography ==
According to the 2010 census, the township has a total area of 35.61 square miles (92.2 km^{2}), of which 35.24 square miles (91.3 km^{2}) (or 98.96%) is land and 0.37 square miles (0.96 km^{2}) (or 1.04%) is water.

=== Cities, towns, villages ===
- North Terre Haute
- Terre Haute (north edge)

=== Unincorporated communities ===
- Atherton
- Burnett
- Markles
- Otter Creek Junction
- Sandcut
- Spelterville

=== Adjacent townships ===
- Florida Township, Parke County (northeast)
- Nevins Township (east)
- Lost Creek Township (southeast)
- Harrison Township (southwest)
- Sugar Creek Township (southwest)
- Fayette Township (west)
- Clinton Township, Vermillion County (northwest)

=== Cemeteries ===
The township contains ten cemeteries: Denny, Evans, Haven, Kennedy, Markles, Phillips, Roselawn Memorial Park, Steveson, Stewart and Wood.

=== Airports and landing strips ===
- Sky King Airport

== School districts ==
- Vigo County School Corporation

== Political districts ==
- Indiana's 8th congressional district
- State House District 42
- State House District 43
- State Senate District 38
