= Sage-Robinson-Nagel House =

Historic house in Indiana, United States

- U.S. National Register of Historic Places
- U.S. Historic district – Contributing property
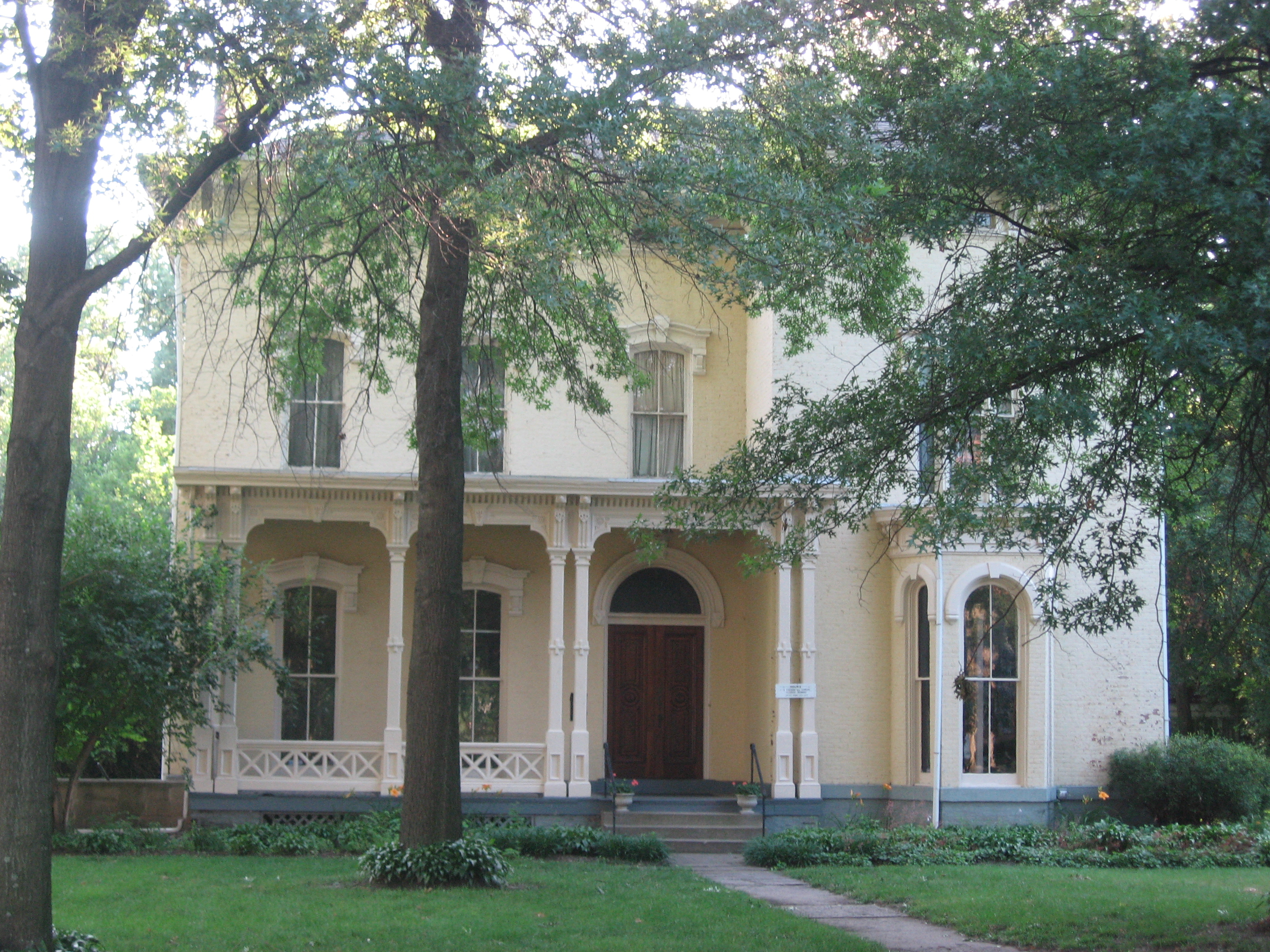
- Sage-Robinson-Nagel House, July 2011

- Location within Vigo County, Indiana Location within Indiana Location within the United States
- Location: 1411 S. 6th St., Terre Haute, Indiana
- Coordinates: 39°27′7″N 87°24′36″W
- Area: less than one acre
- Built: 1868
- Architectural style: Italianate
- NRHP reference No.: 73000025
- Added to NRHP: April 11, 1973

Sage-Robinson-Nagel House, also known as the Historical Museum of the Wabash Valley, is a historic home located at Terre Haute, Indiana. It was built in 1868 and is a two-story, L-shaped, Italianate style brick dwelling. It has a low-pitched hipped roof with heavy double brackets, decorative front porch, and a projecting bay window.

It was listed on the National Register of Historic Places in 1973. It is located in the Farrington's Grove Historic District.
