= Williams-Warren-Zimmerman House =

Historic house in Indiana, United States

- U.S. National Register of Historic Places
- U.S. Historic district – Contributing property
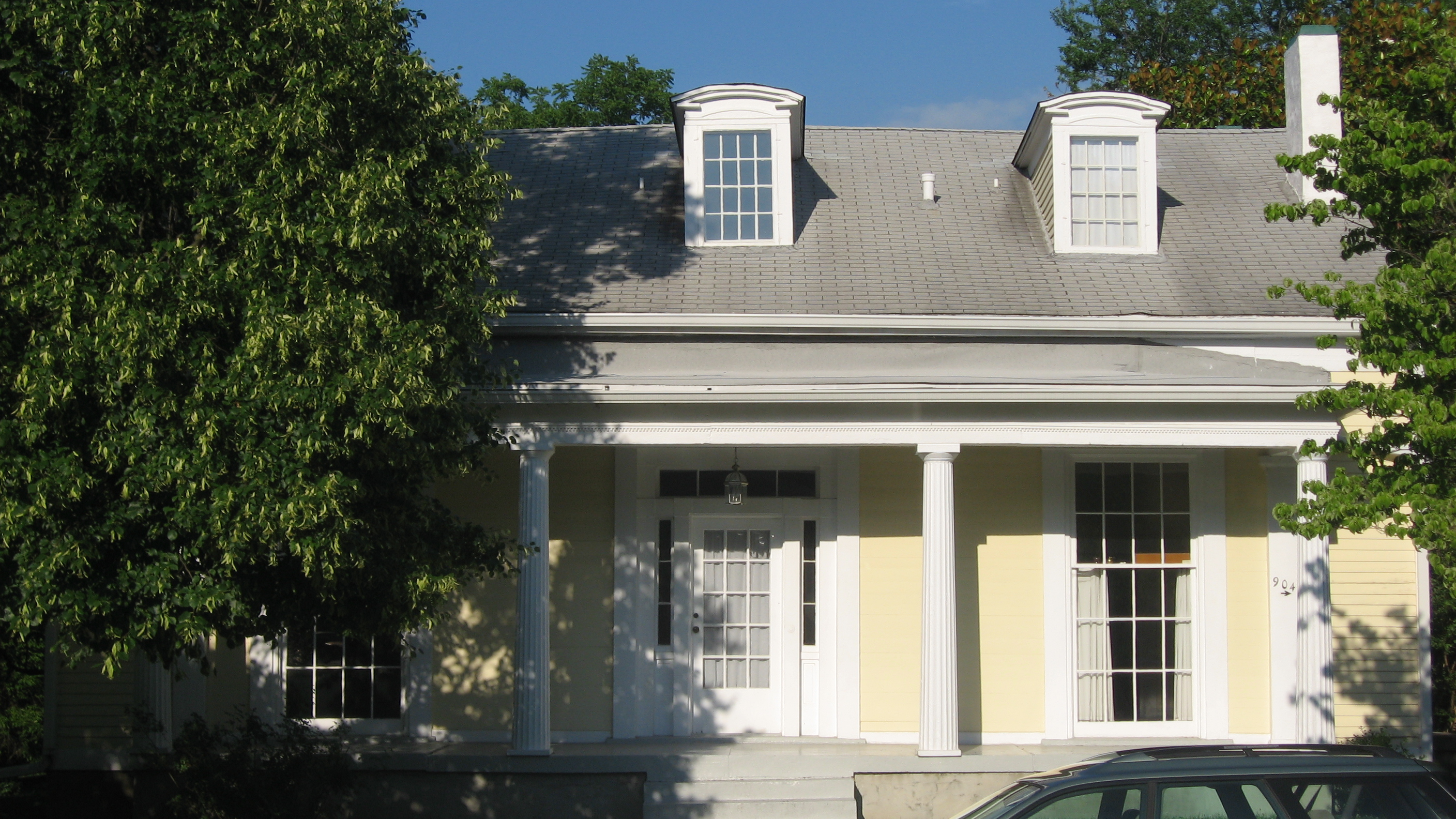
- Williams-Warren-Zimmerman House, July 2011

- Location within Vigo County, Indiana Location within Indiana Location within the United States
- Location: 900-904 S. 4th St., Terre Haute, Indiana
- Coordinates: 39°27′27″N 87°24′44″W
- Area: less than one acre
- Built: 1849-1854
- Architectural style: Greek Revival
- NRHP reference No.: 80000046
- Added to NRHP: October 23, 1980

Williams-Warren-Zimmerman House, also known as the Cottage-Among-the-Lindens, is a historic home located at Terre Haute, Indiana. It was built between 1849 and 1854, and is a 1 1/2-story, Greek Revival style frame dwelling with a one-story wing. It sits on a stuccoed brick foundation, is sheathed in clapboard siding, and has a gable roof with dormers. The house was moved to its present location in 1874.

It was listed on the National Register of Historic Places in 1980. It is located in the Farrington's Grove Historic District.
