= House at 823 Ohio Street =

Historic house in Indiana, United States

- U.S. National Register of Historic Places
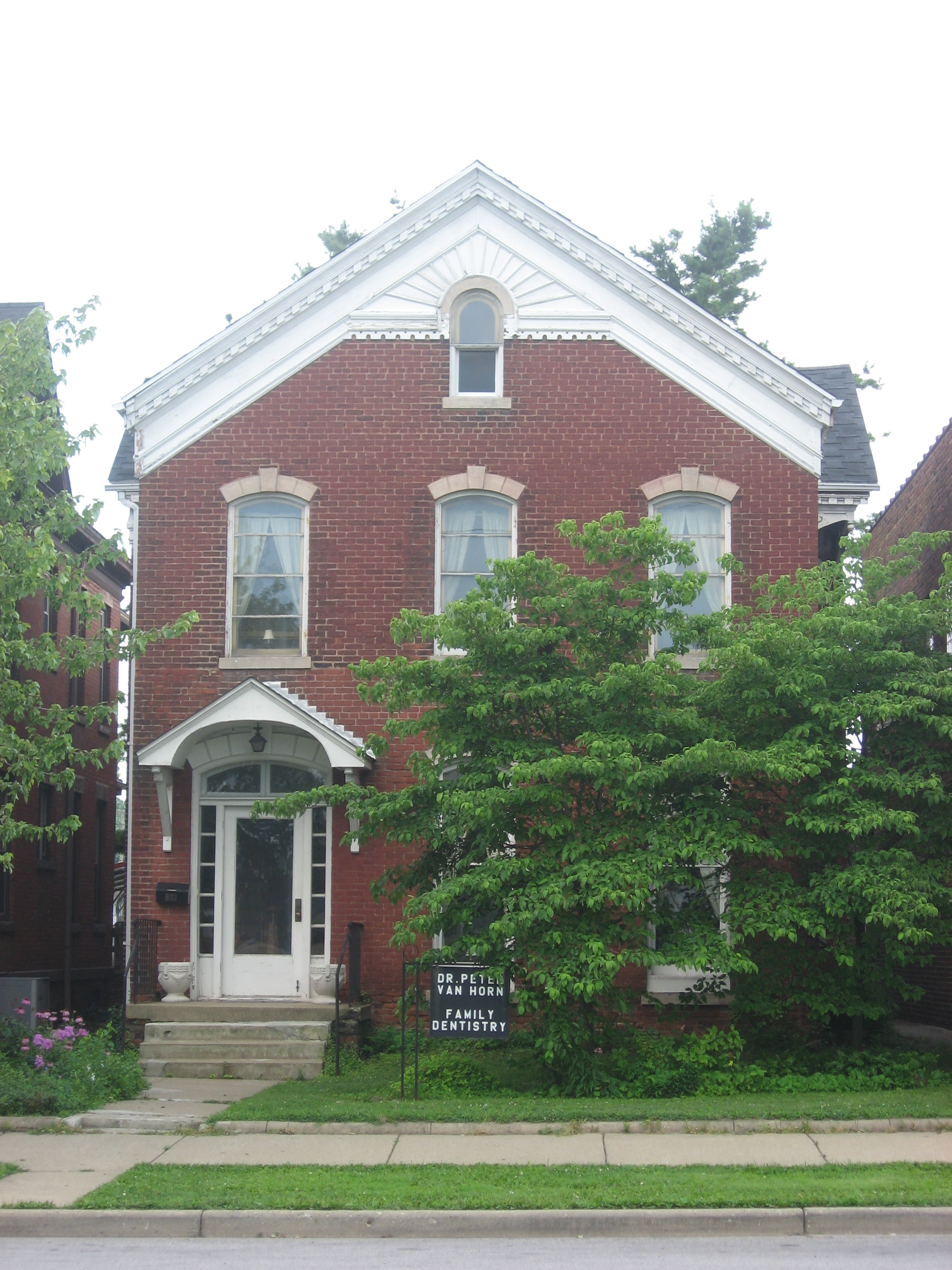
- House at 823 Ohio Street, July 2011

- Location within Vigo County, Indiana Location within Indiana Location within the United States
- Location: 823 Ohio St., Terre Haute, Indiana
- Coordinates: 39°27′55″N 87°24′18″W
- Area: less than one acre
- Built: 1880
- Architectural style: Italianate, Queen Anne
- MPS: Downtown Terre Haute MRA
- NRHP reference No.: 83003441
- Added to NRHP: June 30, 1983

House at 823 Ohio Street is a historic home located at Terre Haute, Indiana. It was built in 1880, and is a two-story, rectangular brick dwelling with Italianate and Queen Anne style design elements. It features segmental arched windows and a rounded arch window with a wood sunburst surround.

It was listed on the National Register of Historic Places in 1983.
