= Farrington's Grove Historic District =

Historic district in Indiana, United States

- U.S. National Register of Historic Places
- U.S. Historic district
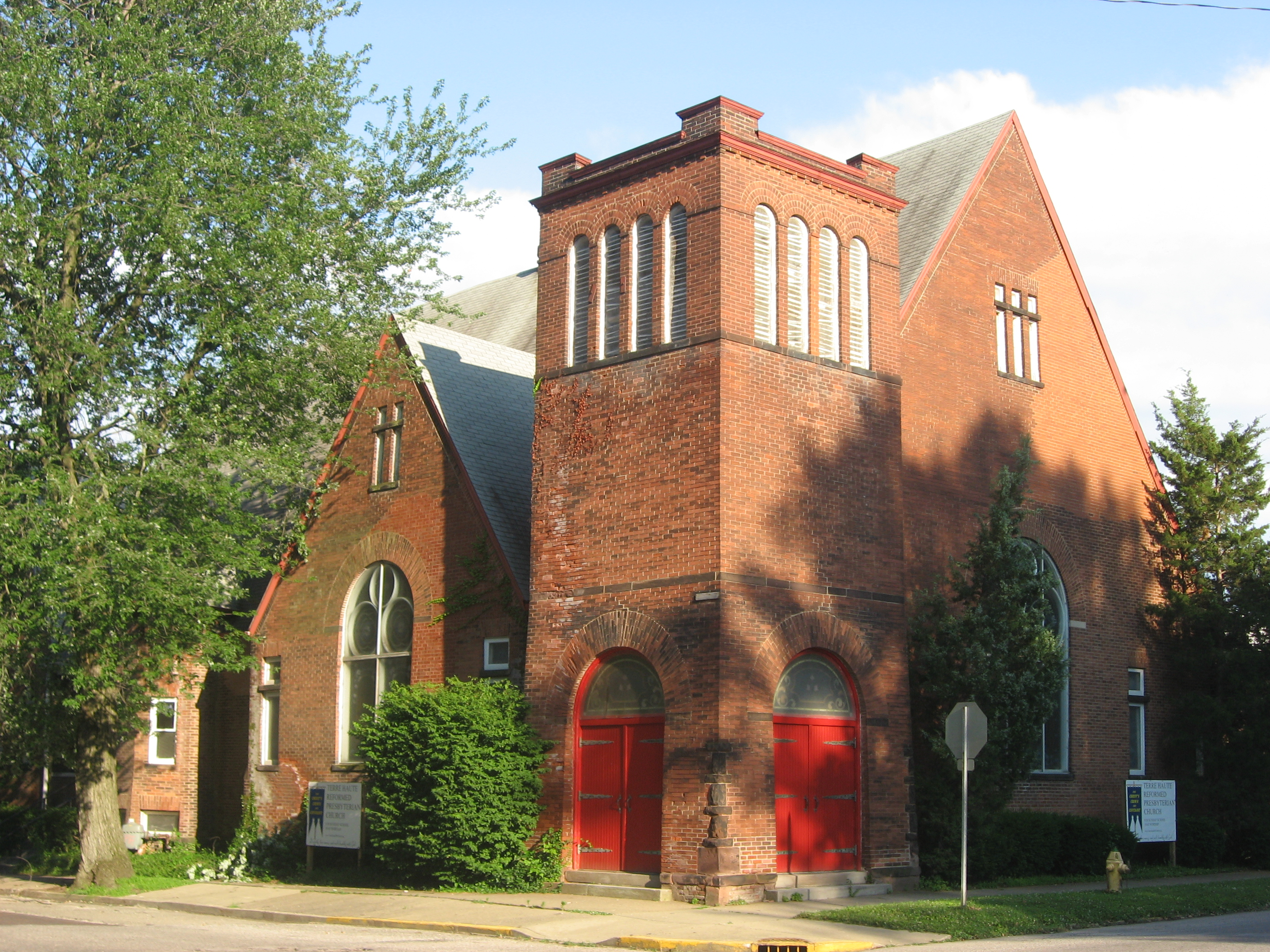
- Church in the Farrington's Grove Historic District, July 2011

- Location within Vigo County, Indiana Location within Indiana Location within the United States
- Location: Roughly bounded by Poplar, S. Seventh, Hulman, and S. Fourth Sts., Terre Haute, Indiana
- Coordinates: 39°27′22″N 87°24′35″W
- Area: 230 acres (93 ha)
- Built: 1850
- Architect: English, Reese P.; Et al.
- Architectural style: Late 19th And 20th Century Revivals, Italianate, Queen Anne
- NRHP reference No.: 86000270
- Added to NRHP: February 27, 1986

Farrington's Grove Historic District is a national historic district located at Terre Haute, Indiana. It encompasses 1,110 contributing buildings in a predominantly residential section of Terre Haute. It developed between about 1850 and 1935, with most built between 1890 and 1920, and includes representative examples of Greek Revival, Italianate, Queen Anne, and Colonial Revival style architecture. Located in the district are the separately listed Sage-Robinson-Nagel House and Williams-Warren-Zimmerman House. Other notable buildings include the English-Bogard House (1873), Kelley-Luther-Trent House (1901), Meyer-Gantner House (1923), Grover-Shannon-Lee House (1856), Potter-Steele-Tablr House (1870), Reckert-Robertson House (1890), Hawthorne Building (1871), and Temple Israel (1911).

It was listed on the National Register of Historic Places in 1986.
