= Collett Park Neighborhood Historic District =

Historic district in Indiana, United States

- U.S. National Register of Historic Places
- U.S. Historic district
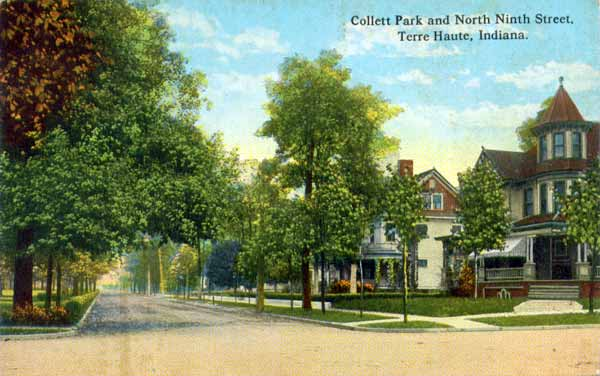
- Collett Park Neighborhood circa 1913

- Location within Vigo County, Indiana Location within Indiana Location within the United States
- Location: Roughly bounded by 7th St., Maple Ave., 11th St., and Florida Ave., Terre Haute, Indiana; United States
- Coordinates: 39°29′44″N 87°24′18″W
- Architectural style: Queen Anne Style, Shingle Style, Colonial Revival
- NRHP reference No.: 04000207
- Added to NRHP: March 22, 2004

Collett Park Neighborhood Historic District is a residential area in Terre Haute, surrounding Collett Park.

Collett Park was established in 1883 and named after its benefactor, Josephus Collett. A community of residents soon formed around it, living mainly in large, single-family houses that were set up in a grid around the park. Many of the homes were built between 1900 and 1920 and are of various architectural styles, including Queen Anne Style, Free Classic, Shingle Style and Colonial Revival.

The area, with its tree-lined streets and impressive dwellings, became a fashionable place for the established residents of Terre Haute to live. In the time when Rose Polytechnic Institute (now Rose-Hulman Institute of Technology) was located only a few blocks south of the area, several professors built homes in the Collett Park neighborhood.

Collett Park Neighborhood Historic District was placed on the National Register of Historic Places in 2004 for its significance in architecture, community planning and landscape architecture. The Collett Park Homeowners Association helps care for the neighborhood. Collett Park itself was placed on the Register in 1983.
