= House at 209–211 S. Ninth Street =

Historic house in Indiana, United States

- Formerly listed on the U.S. National Register of Historic Places
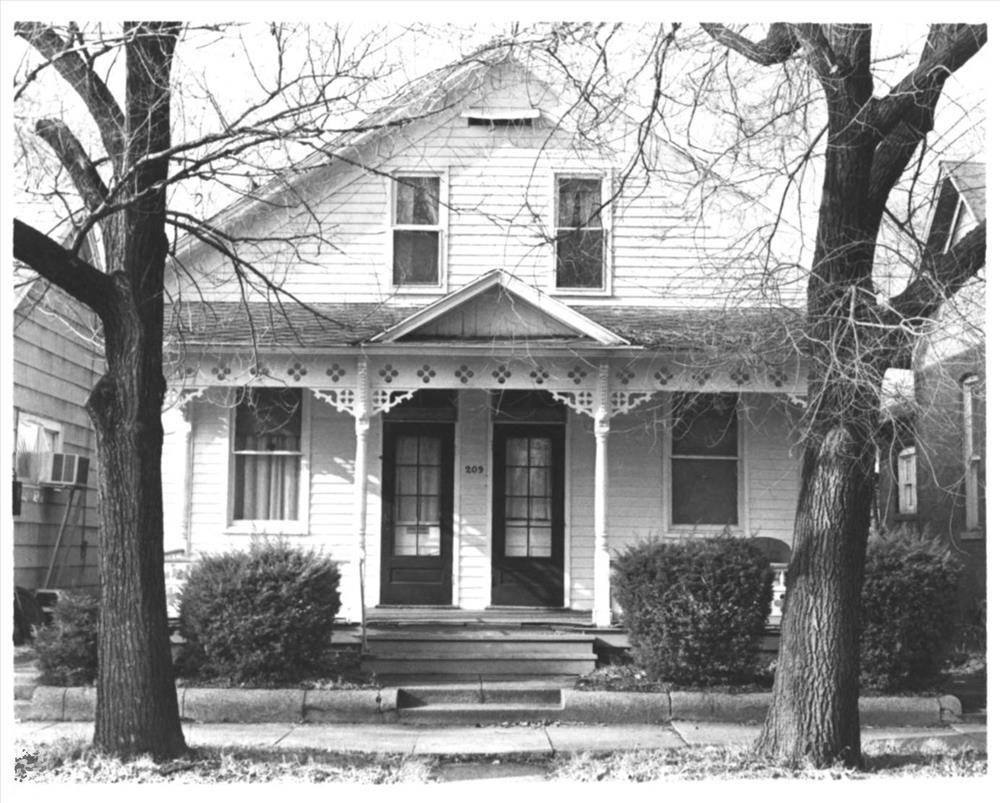
- The house in 1983

- Location within Vigo County, Indiana Location within Indiana Location within the United States
- Location: 209–211 S. 9th St., Terre Haute, Indiana
- Coordinates: 39°27′50″N 87°24′16″W
- Area: less than one acre
- Built: 1880
- Architectural style: Late Victorian, Eastlake-style Porch
- MPS: Downtown Terre Haute MRA
- NRHP reference No.: 83000109

Significant dates
- Added to NRHP: June 30, 1983
- Removed from NRHP: March 3, 2019

The house at 209–211 S. Ninth Street was a historic home located at Terre Haute, Indiana. It was built about 1880, and was a one-story, Late Victorian rectangular frame duplex cottage. It featured an elaborate Eastlake movement style front porch with a shed roof. It has been demolished.

It was listed on the National Register of Historic Places in 1983, and was delisted in 2019.

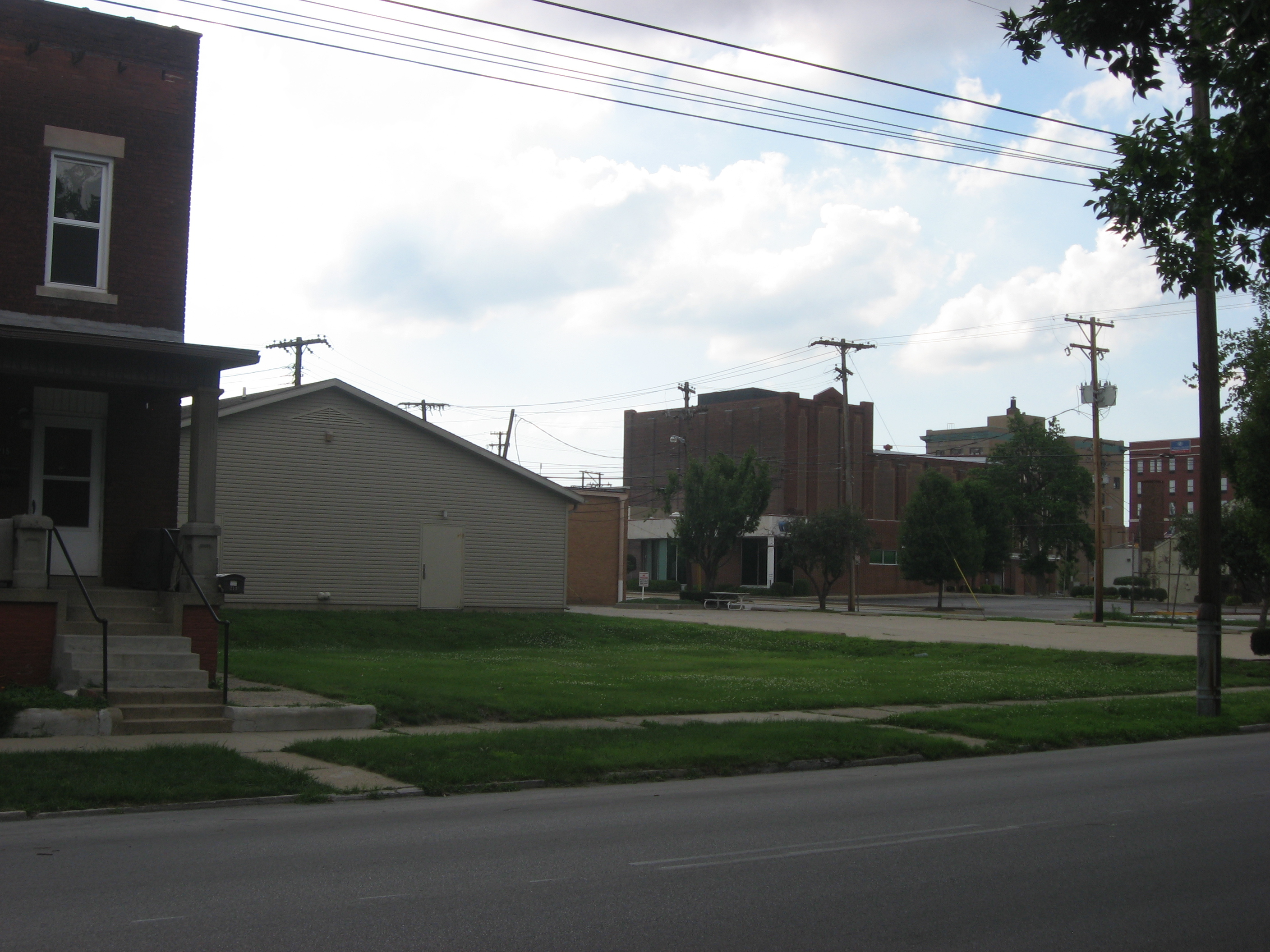
Site of the house at 209–211 S. Ninth Street, July 2011

The house no longer exists, or is no longer at its original location, in 2011.
