= Building at 23–27 S. Sixth Street =

- U.S. National Register of Historic Places
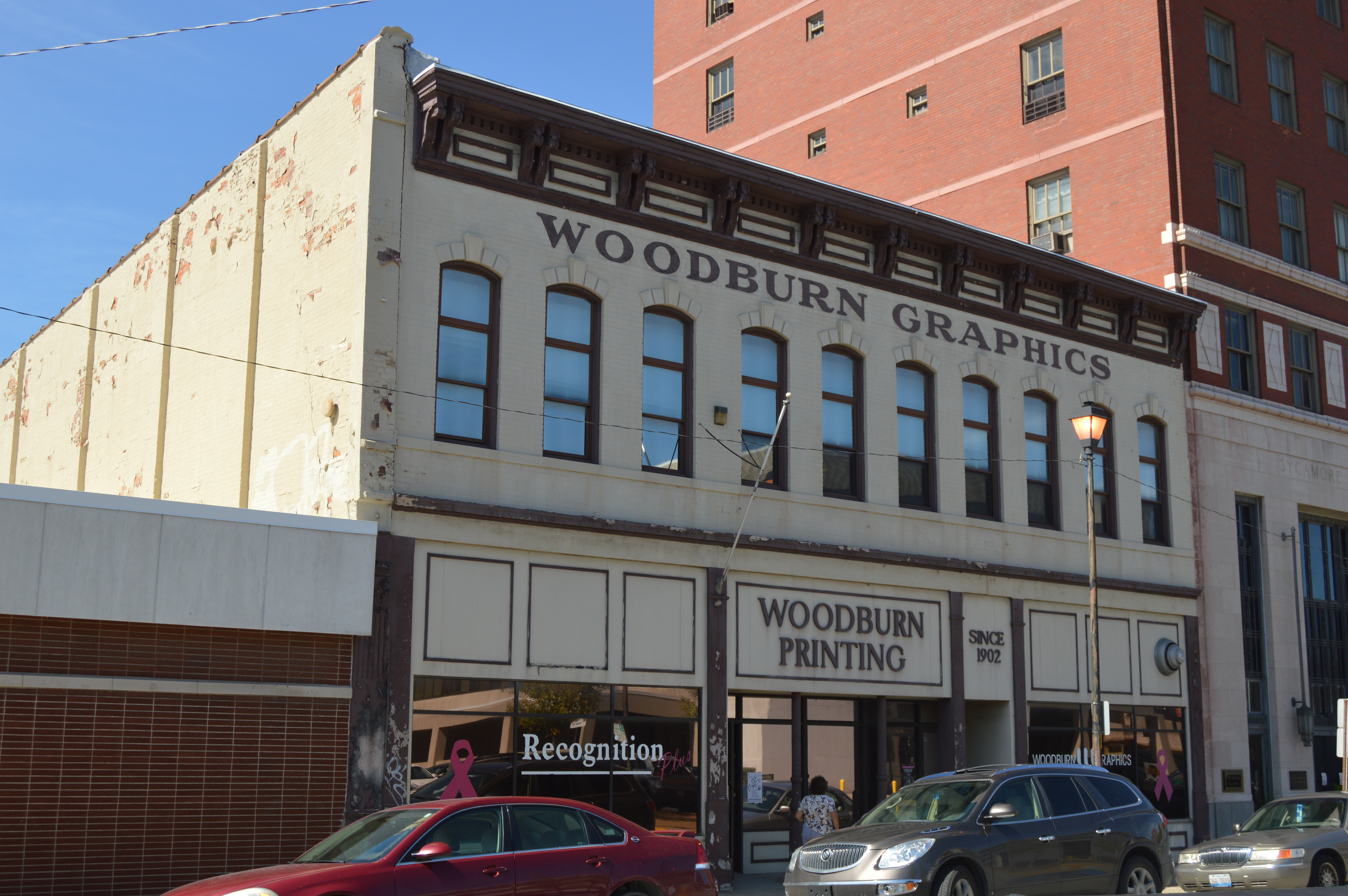
- Front and southern side

- Location within Vigo County, Indiana Location within Indiana Location within the United States
- Location: 23–27 S. 6th St., Terre Haute, Indiana
- Coordinates: 39°27′56.5″N 87°24′37″W
- Area: less than one acre
- Built: 1882
- Architectural style: Italianate
- MPS: Downtown Terre Haute MRA
- NRHP reference No.: 83000111
- Added to NRHP: June 30, 1983

Building at 23–27 S. Sixth Street is a historic commercial building located at Terre Haute, Indiana. It was built in 1882, and is a two-story, rectangular, Italianate style brick building. It features a cast iron storefront on the first story, tall, narrow segmental arched windows on the second, and a projecting cornice. It was renovated in 1975.

It was listed on the National Register of Historic Places in 1983.
