= Phoenix Club (Terre Haute, Indiana) =

- Formerly listed on the U.S. National Register of Historic Places
- Location: 201 S.5th St., Terre Haute, Indiana
- Area: less than one acre
- Built: 1905
- Architectural style: Renaissance
- MPS: Downtown Terre Haute MRA
- NRHP reference No.: 83000108

Significant dates
- Added to NRHP: June 30, 1983
- Removed from NRHP: May 24, 1993

Phoenix Club was a historic clubhouse located at Terre Haute, Indiana. It was built in 1905, and was a two-story, rectangular, Renaissance Revival style pressed brick building with limestone detailing. It was built to house the Phoenix Club, a Jewish men's organization. It later housed the Central Labor Union of Vigo County. It has been demolished.

It was listed on the National Register of Historic Places in 1983 and delisted in 1993.
