= North Terre Haute, Indiana =

- Census-designated place
- Location of North Terre Haute in Vigo County, Indiana.
- Coordinates: 39°31′54″N 87°22′43″W
- Country: United States
- State: Indiana
- County: Vigo
- Township: Otter Creek

Area
  - Total: 3.58 sq mi (9.28 km^{2})
  - Land: 3.58 sq mi (9.28 km^{2})
  - Water: 0 sq mi (0.00 km^{2})
- Elevation: 515 ft (157 m)

Population (2020)
  - Total: 4,222
  - Density: 1,178.9/sq mi (455.19/km^{2})
- Time zone: UTC-5 (Eastern (EST))
  - Summer (DST): UTC-4 (EDT)
- ZIP code: 47805
- Area codes: 812, 930
- FIPS code: 18-55098
- GNIS feature ID: 2393155

North Terre Haute is a census-designated place (CDP) in Otter Creek Township, Vigo County, in the U.S. state of Indiana. As of the 2020 census, North Terre Haute had a population of 4,222. It is part of the Terre Haute Metropolitan Statistical Area.

== History ==
A post office was established at North Terre Haute in 1912, and remained in operation until it was discontinued in 1957.

== Geography ==
According to the United States Census Bureau, the CDP has a total area of 3.6 square miles (9.3 km^{2}), all land.

== Demographics ==
Historical population
Census	Pop.	Note	%±
2020	4,222		—
U.S. Decennial Census

=== 2020 census ===
As of the 2020 census, North Terre Haute had a population of 4,222. The median age was 42.0 years. 22.1% of residents were under the age of 18 and 18.3% of residents were 65 years of age or older. For every 100 females there were 99.3 males, and for every 100 females age 18 and over there were 95.3 males age 18 and over.

100.0% of residents lived in urban areas, while 0.0% lived in rural areas.

There were 1,819 households in North Terre Haute, of which 26.9% had children under the age of 18 living in them. Of all households, 44.0% were married-couple households, 20.8% were households with a male householder and no spouse or partner present, and 26.7% were households with a female householder and no spouse or partner present. About 31.2% of all households were made up of individuals and 11.4% had someone living alone who was 65 years of age or older.

There were 1,957 housing units, of which 7.1% were vacant. The homeowner vacancy rate was 1.2% and the rental vacancy rate was 6.1%.

Racial composition as of the 2020 census
Race	Number	Percent
White	3,917	92.8%
Black or African American	86	2.0%
American Indian and Alaska Native	3	0.1%
Asian	19	0.5%
Native Hawaiian and Other Pacific Islander	0	0.0%
Some other race	17	0.4%
Two or more races	180	4.3%
Hispanic or Latino (of any race)	73	1.7%

=== 2000 census ===
As of the 2000 census, there were 4,606 people, 1,850 households, and 1,235 families residing in the CDP. The population density was 1,287.3 inhabitants per square mile (497.0/km^{2}). There were 1,950 housing units at an average density of 545.0 per square mile (210.4/km^{2}). The racial makeup of the CDP was 96.18% White, 2.56% African American, 0.30% Native American, 0.35% Asian, 0.04% from other races, and 0.56% from two or more races. Hispanic or Latino of any race were 1.00% of the population.

There were 1,850 households, out of which 30.8% had children under the age of 18 living with them, 51.4% were married couples living together, 11.1% had a female householder with no husband present, and 33.2% were non-families. 27.9% of all households were made up of individuals, and 9.5% had someone living alone who was 65 years of age or older. The average household size was 2.42 and the average family size was 2.94.

In the CDP, the population was spread out, with 26.7% under the age of 18, 8.6% from 18 to 24, 29.3% from 25 to 44, 22.6% from 45 to 64, and 12.8% who were 65 years of age or older. The median age was 36 years. For every 100 females, there were 101.4 males. For every 100 females age 18 and over, there were 92.3 males.

The median income for a household in the CDP was $34,617, and the median income for a family was $42,469. Males had a median income of $33,306 versus $22,813 for females. The per capita income for the CDP was $15,729. About 8.7% of families and 9.6% of the population were below the poverty line, including 8.0% of those under age 18 and 8.7% of those age 65 or over.

== Education ==
All areas in Vigo County are in the Vigo County School Corporation. Northern portions of North Terre Haute are zoned to Rio Grande Elementary School, while southern portions are zoned to Terre Town Elementary School. All portions of the CDP are zoned to Otter Creek Middle School and Terre Haute North Vigo High School.
