= DeWees-Preston-Smith House =

Historic house in Indiana, United States

- Formerly listed on the U.S. National Register of Historic Places
- Location: 1339 Poplar St., Terre Haute, Indiana
- Area: 1.7 acres (0.69 ha)
- Built: 1823-1826
- Built by: Dewees, Major George W.
- Architectural style: Southern Post Colonial
- NRHP reference No.: 82000048

Significant dates
- Added to NRHP: December 27, 1982
- Removed from NRHP: July 24, 1989

DeWees-Preston-Smith House was a historic home located at Terre Haute, Indiana. It was built between 1823 and 1826, and was a 1 1/2-story, vernacular Southern post-colonial style stone dwelling. It featured a full-width verandah and a stuccoed front. It was damaged by fire in 1979, and was the oldest remaining structure in Terre Haute. It has been demolished.

It was listed on the National Register of Historic Places in 1982 and delisted in 1989.
