= Indiana State Road 246 =

Highway in Indiana

State Road 246
- SR 246 highlighted in red

Route information
- Maintained by INDOT
- Length: 37.876 mi (60.956 km)

Major junctions
- West end: SR 63 at Prairie Creek
- US 41 / US 150 near Farmersburg
- East end: SR 46 at Vandalia

Location
- Country: United States
- State: Indiana
- Counties: Clay, Owen, Vigo

Highway system
- Indiana State Highway System; Interstate; US; State; Scenic
← SR 245	→ SR 249

State Road 246 is an east–west road in the southwest portion of the U.S. state of Indiana.

== Route description ==
State Road 246 begins in the small town of Prairie Creek at State Road 63. Going east, it crosses U.S. Route 41 just north of Farmersburg. It veers slightly south in order to pass through Lewis where it is concurrent with State Road 159, then jogs north again to hit Middlebury and Clay City where it is concurrent with State Road 59. Continuing east, it winds to the northeast to pass through Patricksburg, then runs directly east to State Road 46 at Vandalia.

State Road 46, its parent route, angles northwest to Terre Haute from Vandalia, whereas State Road 246 goes west.

== Major intersections ==
County	Location	mi	km	Destinations	Notes
Vigo	Prairie Creek	0.000	0.000	SR 63 south – Merom, Terre Haute	West end of SR 246; north end of the southern segment of SR 63
Vigo	Linton Township	5.859	9.429	US 41 / US 150 – Vincennes, Terre Haute	
Vigo	Lewis	13.183	21.216	SR 159 north – Riley	West end of SR 159 concurrency
Clay	Lewis Township	14.854	23.905	SR 159 south – Jasonville	East end of SR 159 concurrency
Clay	Clay City	21.510	34.617	SR 59 south – Jasonville	South end of SR 59 concurrency
Clay	Clay City	22.652	36.455	SR 157 south – Coal City	North end of SR 157
Clay	Clay City	23.019	37.045	SR 59 north – Brazil	North end of SR 59 concurrency
Owen	Vandalia	37.876	60.956	SR 46 – Spencer	East end of SR 246
1.000 mi = 1.609 km; 1.000 km = 0.621 mi: Concurrency terminus
