= Linton Township =

Linton Township may refer to the following townships in the United States:

- Linton Township, Vigo County, Indiana
- Linton Township, Coshocton County, Ohio
- Linton Township, Allamakee County, Iowa

== See also ==
- Linton Township High School and Community Building
