= Indiana State Road 641 =

Highway in Indiana

State Road 641
- Terre Haute Bypass
- SR 641 highlighted in red

Route information
- Maintained by INDOT
- Length: 6.2 mi (10.0 km)
- Existed: October 26, 2010–present
- History: Completed January 20, 2017

Major junctions
- South end: US 41 in Honey Creek Township
- SR 46 in Riley Township
- North end: I-70 / US 40 to SR 42 in Riley Township

Location
- Country: United States
- State: Indiana
- Counties: Vigo

Highway system
- Indiana State Highway System; Interstate; US; State; Scenic
← SR 558	→ SR 645

State Road 641 (SR 641) in the U.S. state of Indiana is a state road in Vigo County that bypasses southeast Terre Haute. The highway connects U.S. Route 41 (US 41) in the south and Interstate 70 (I-70) in the north.

== Route description ==
SR 641 is a freeway southeast of Terre Haute that starts at an interchange along US 41 near Eaton Road in Honey Creek Township and branches off to the northeast toward Woodsmall Road, then turns north. A folded diamond interchange connects SR 641 to McDaniel Road. To the north of the interchange, the freeway crosses a CSX Railroad line and curves to the east, crossing into Riley Township. SR 641 meets SR 46 at Riley Road. SR 46 merges onto the new freeway at this intersection and the two highways run concurrently as they curve north to meet I-70. SR 641 ends at the new interchange with I-70 and US 40, while SR 46 continues northward on its current highway routing.

== History ==
The concept of a Terre Haute bypass was first presented to INDOT in 1989. Official plans were adopted in mid- to late-1990. A feasibility assessment was conducted in December 1990, and the project was included in the Indiana State Highway Improvement Program on August 29, 1991. The "Engineer’s Report for S.R. 641 (Terre Haute) Bypass" was completed in January 1995.

The project was developed to shorten travel times between US 41 and I-70, and avoid traffic congestion in central Terre Haute. The new freeway reduces travel distance by 3.0 miles (4.8 km) and bypass eleven stoplights.

Construction on SR 641 was planned in four phases. Phase I concentrated on the southernmost segment of the new highway from US 41 north and east to Woodsmall Road. Phase II runs from Woodsmall Road to Feree Road. Phase I and part of Phase II up to McDaniel Road were completed and opened to traffic on October 26, 2010. Phases III and IV completed the bypass. Construction on these two phases had a target completion date of late 2016, and the full bypass opened on January 20, 2017.

== Exit list ==
The entire route is in Vigo County.

Location	mi	km	Exit	Destinations	Notes
Honey Creek Township	0.0	0.0		US 41 – Terre Haute, Evansville	
Honey Creek Township				McDaniel Road	
Riley Township				SR 46 east / Riley Road – Bloomington	Southern end of SR 46 concurrency
Riley Township	6.2	10.0		I-70 / US 40 / SR 46 east – Indianapolis, St. Louis	Northern end of SR 46 and SR 641; roadway continues north as US 40; interchange under renovation
1.000 mi = 1.609 km; 1.000 km = 0.621 mi: Concurrency terminus
