= Blackhawk, Indiana =

- Unincorporated community
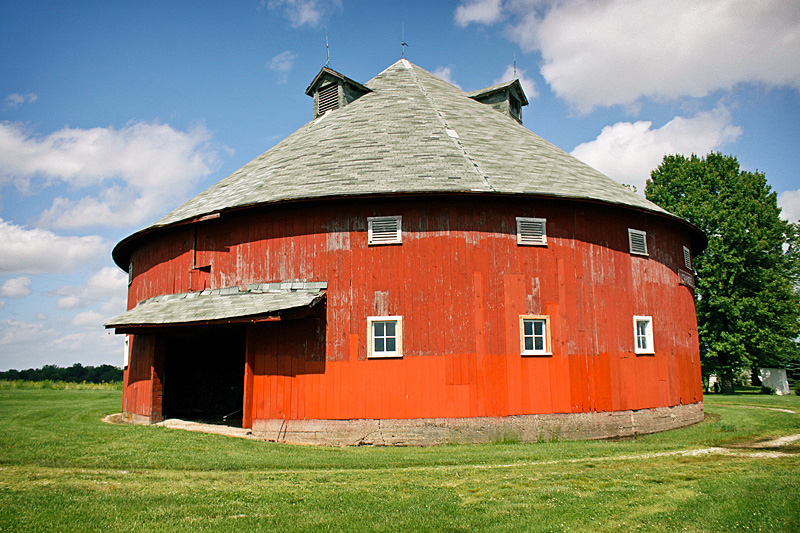
- The Frank Senour Round Barn

- Vigo County's location in Indiana

- Location within Vigo County, Indiana
- Coordinates: 39°18′32″N 87°18′01″W
- Country: United States
- State: Indiana
- County: Vigo
- Township: Pierson
- Elevation: 600 ft (183 m)
- Time zone: UTC-5 (Eastern (EST))
  - Summer (DST): UTC-4 (EDT)
- ZIP code: 47866
- Area codes: 812, 930
- GNIS feature ID: 431150

Blackhawk is an unincorporated community in Pierson Township, Vigo County, in the U.S. state of Indiana. The nearest official town is Riley. Blackhawk has one listing on the National Register of Historic Places in Vigo County, the Frank Senour Round Barn, built in 1905.

== History ==
A post office was established at Blackhawk in 1901, and remained in operation until it was discontinued in 1927.

== Geography ==
Blackhawk is located at 39°18′32″N 87°18′01″W at an elevation of 600 feet.
