= Baldridge =

Baldridge is a surname. Notable people with the surname include:

- Adam Baldridge (fl. 1690–1697), English pirate
- Brian Baldridge (born 1969), American politician
- Cyrus Leroy Baldridge (1889–1977), American artist
- Daniel Baldridge (born 1985), American football player
- Drew Baldridge (born 1991), American country music singer/songwriter
- H. C. Baldridge (1868–1947), governor of Idaho
- Jim Baldridge (fl. 1960s–2000s), American newscaster

== See also ==
- Baldridge, Indiana, unincorporated community in Indiana, United States
- Baldrige
