= Pierson Township, Vigo County, Indiana =

Pierson Township
- Township
- Location in Vigo County
- Coordinates: 39°18′11″N 87°17′35″W
- Country: United States
- State: Indiana
- County: Vigo

Government
  - Type: Indiana township

Area
  - Total: 36 sq mi (93 km^{2})
  - Land: 35.35 sq mi (91.6 km^{2})
  - Water: 0.65 sq mi (1.7 km^{2}) 1.81%
- Elevation: 590 ft (180 m)

Population (2020)
  - Total: 1,251
  - Density: 34.2/sq mi (13.2/km^{2})
- Time zone: UTC-5 (Eastern (EST))
  - Summer (DST): UTC-4 (EDT)
- ZIP codes: 47802, 47850, 47858, 47866
- GNIS feature ID: 453731

Pierson Township is one of twelve townships in Vigo County, Indiana, United States. At the 2010 census, the population was 1,210 and it contained 589 housing units.

== History ==
Frank Senour Round Barn was listed on the National Register of Historic Places in 1993.

== Geography ==
According to the 2010 census, the township has a total area of 36 square miles (93 km^{2}), of which 35.35 square miles (91.6 km^{2}) (or 98.19%) is land and 0.65 square miles (1.7 km^{2}) (or 1.81%) is water.

=== Unincorporated communities ===
- Blackhawk
- Brown Jug Corner
- Hickory Island
- Lewis

=== Adjacent townships ===
- Riley Township (north)
- Perry Township, Clay County (northeast)
- Lewis Township, Clay County (southeast)
- Jackson Township, Sullivan County (south)
- Curry Township, Sullivan County (southwest)
- Linton Township (west)
- Honey Creek Township (northwest)

=== Cemeteries ===
The township contains these six cemeteries: Armstrong, Brown, Donham, Ruggles, Stephens and Taylor.

=== Airports and landing strips ===
- Ellis Fly-In

=== Lakes ===
- Fox Lake
- French Lake
- Israel Lake
- Paint Mill Lake

== School districts ==
- Vigo County School Corporation

== Political districts ==
- Indiana's 8th congressional district
- State House District 46
- State Senate District 39
