= Vandalia, Indiana =

- Unincorporated community
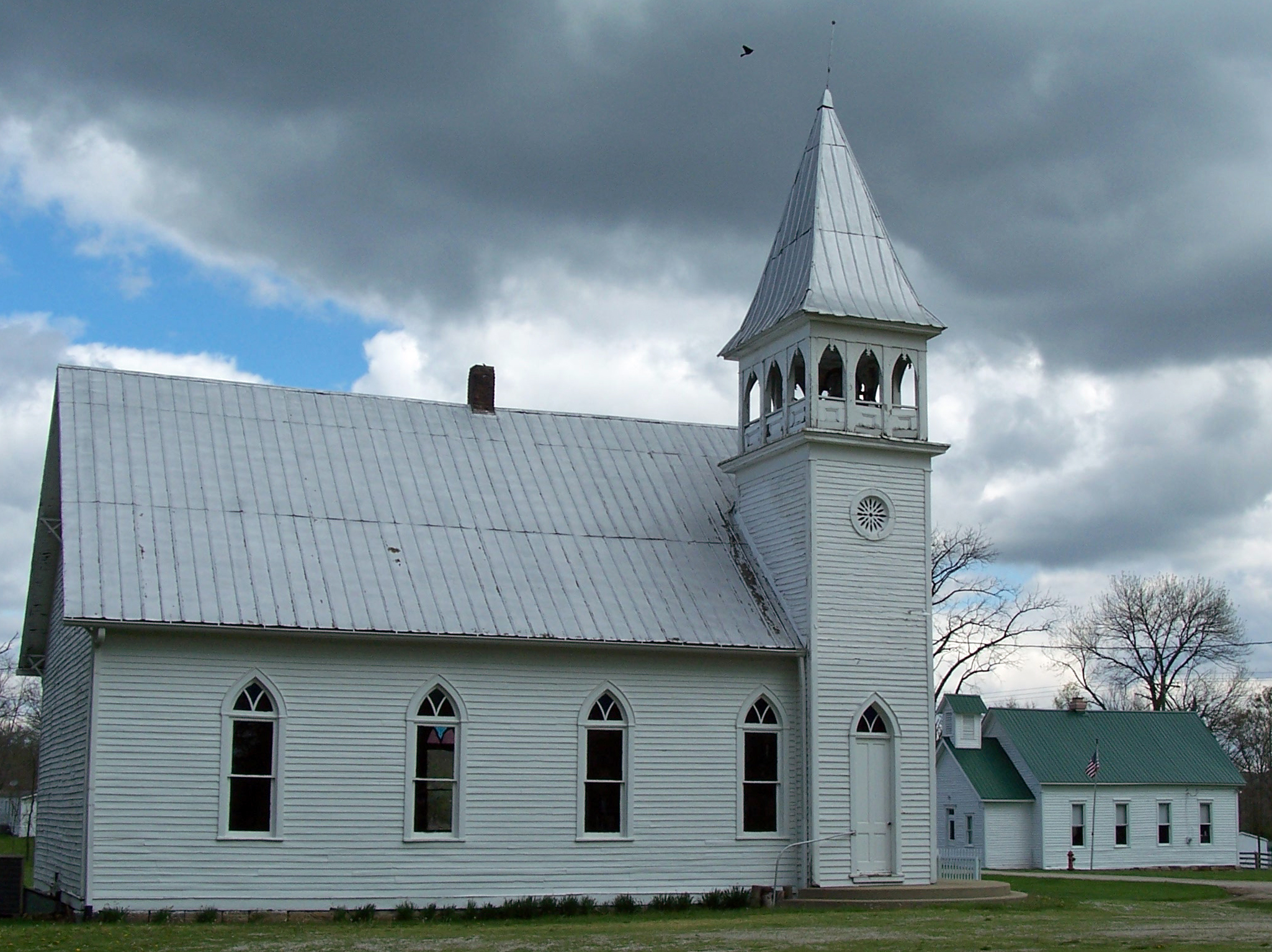
- Vandalia, Indiana Historic Chapel & School

- Location within Indiana Location within the United States
- Coordinates: 39°18′45″N 86°51′58″W
- Country: United States
- State: Indiana
- County: Owen
- Township: Lafayette
- Elevation: 790 ft (240 m)
- Time zone: UTC-5 (Eastern (EST))
  - Summer (DST): UTC-4 (EDT)
- ZIP code: 47868
- Area codes: 812, 930
- GNIS feature ID: 445224

Vandalia is an unincorporated community in Lafayette Township, Owen County, in the U.S. state of Indiana.

== History ==
Vandalia was laid out in 1839. A post office was established at Vandalia in 1846, and remained in operation until it was discontinued in 1927. Two remaining landmarks and reminders of Vandalia's past are the historic chapel (built in 1895) and one-room schoolhouse (building completed in 1868), preserved and maintained by the Vandalia Community Preservation Association.

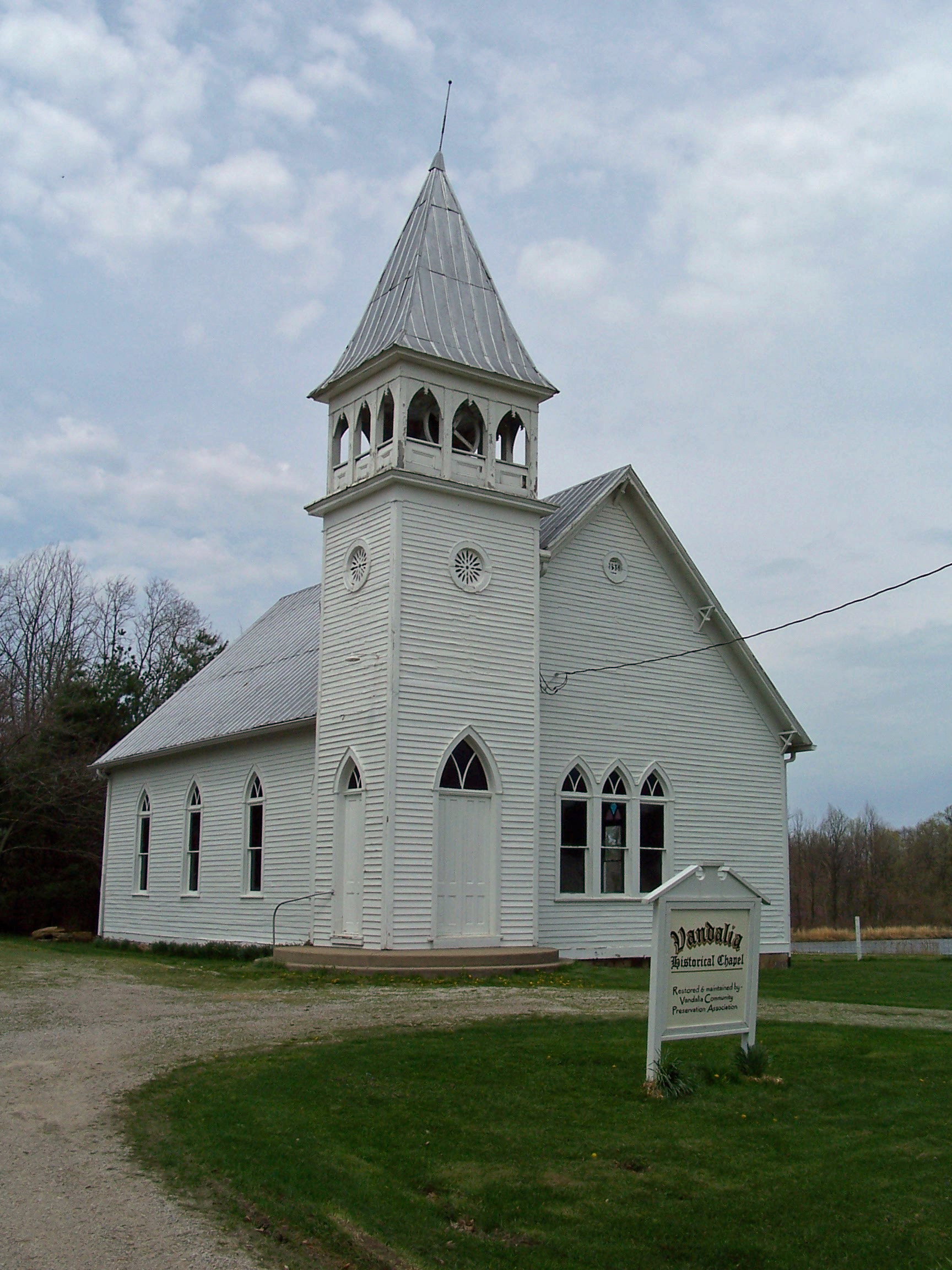
Vandalia, Indiana Historic Chapel

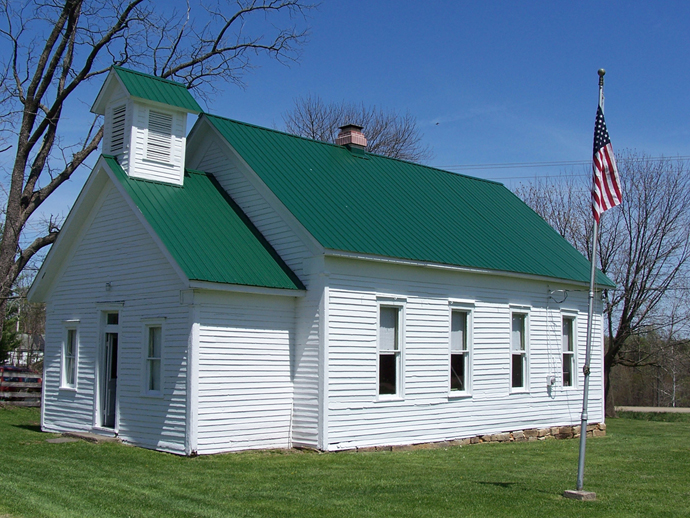
Vandalia, Indiana Historic One-Room School

== Geography ==
Vandalia is located at 39°18′45″N 86°51′58″W at an elevation of 787 feet. It lies at the east end of State Road 246 where it intersects State Road 46. The main village originated near coordinates 39.3137257,-86.8679851.
