= Pimento, Indiana =

- Unincorporated community
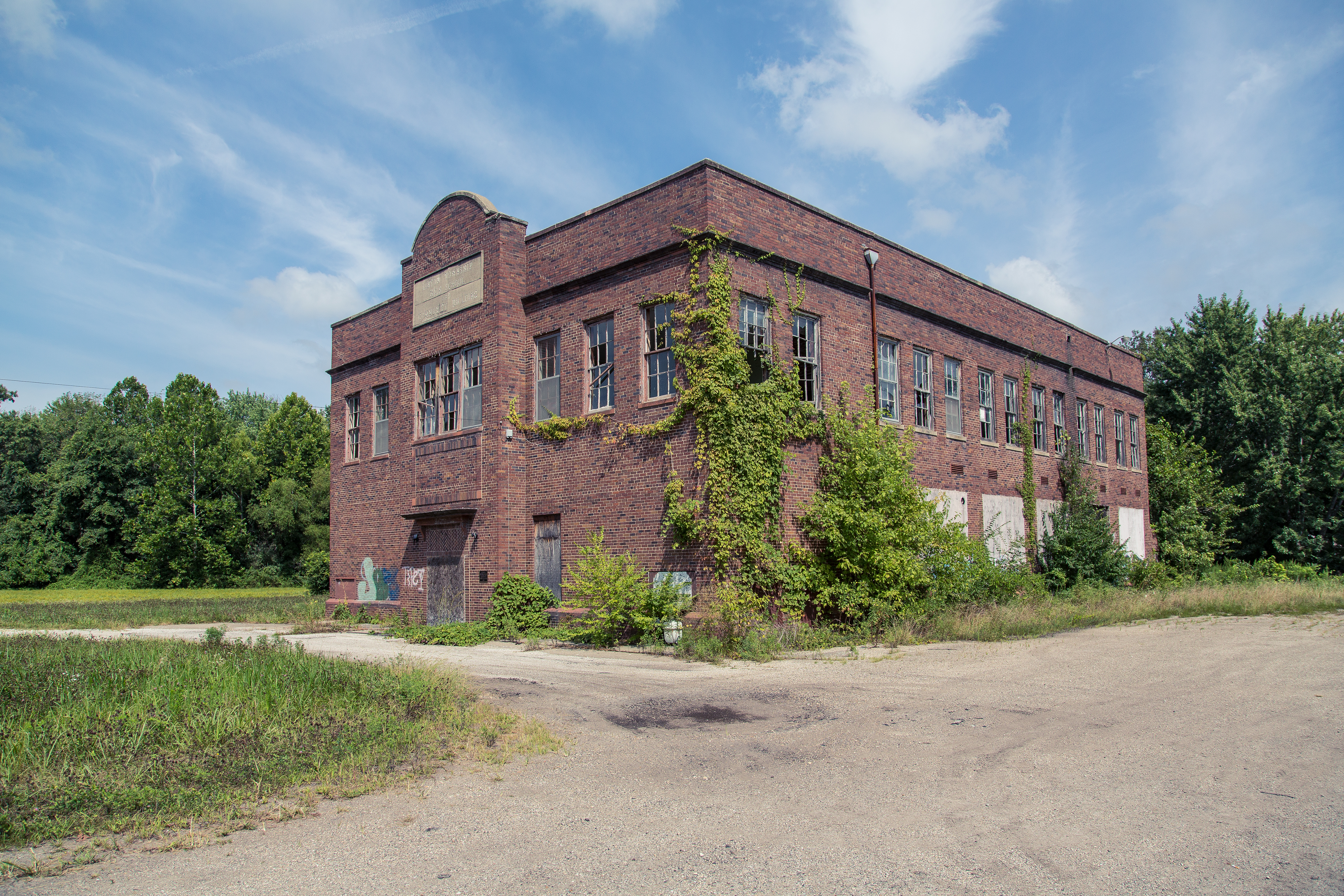

- Vigo County's location in Indiana

- Location in Vigo County, Indiana
- Coordinates: 39°18′34″N 87°22′45″W
- Country: United States
- State: Indiana
- County: Vigo
- Township: Linton
- Elevation: 600 ft (183 m)
- Time zone: UTC-5 (Eastern (EST))
  - Summer (DST): UTC-4 (EDT)
- ZIP code: 47866
- Area codes: 812, 930
- FIPS code: 18-59868
- GNIS feature ID: 441145

Pimento is an unincorporated community in Linton Township, Vigo County, in the U.S. state of Indiana. It is part of the Terre Haute Metropolitan Statistical Area.

Pimento has one listing on the National Register of Historic Places, the Linton Township High School and Community Building.

== History ==
Formerly known as Hartford, Pimento was laid out in 1852 by Israel French. The name was changed to Pimento when it became a railroad station on the Evansville & Terre Haute Railroad. Thomas French made the first location in the place and put up a store. The next year came Harvey Weeks, who became a partner in the store. N. B. Bennett began a drug store in 1865, and then a grocery store. A large flour mill was built in 1877, and a tavern, large dry goods store and blacksmith shop soon followed. A town-house was erected in 1858 and the lower part used as a school house.

The post office at Pimento has been in operation since 1855.

== Geography ==
Pimento is located at 39°18′34″N 87°22′45″W.
