= Vermilyea Inn Historic District =

Historic district in Indiana, United States

- U.S. National Register of Historic Places
- U.S. Historic district
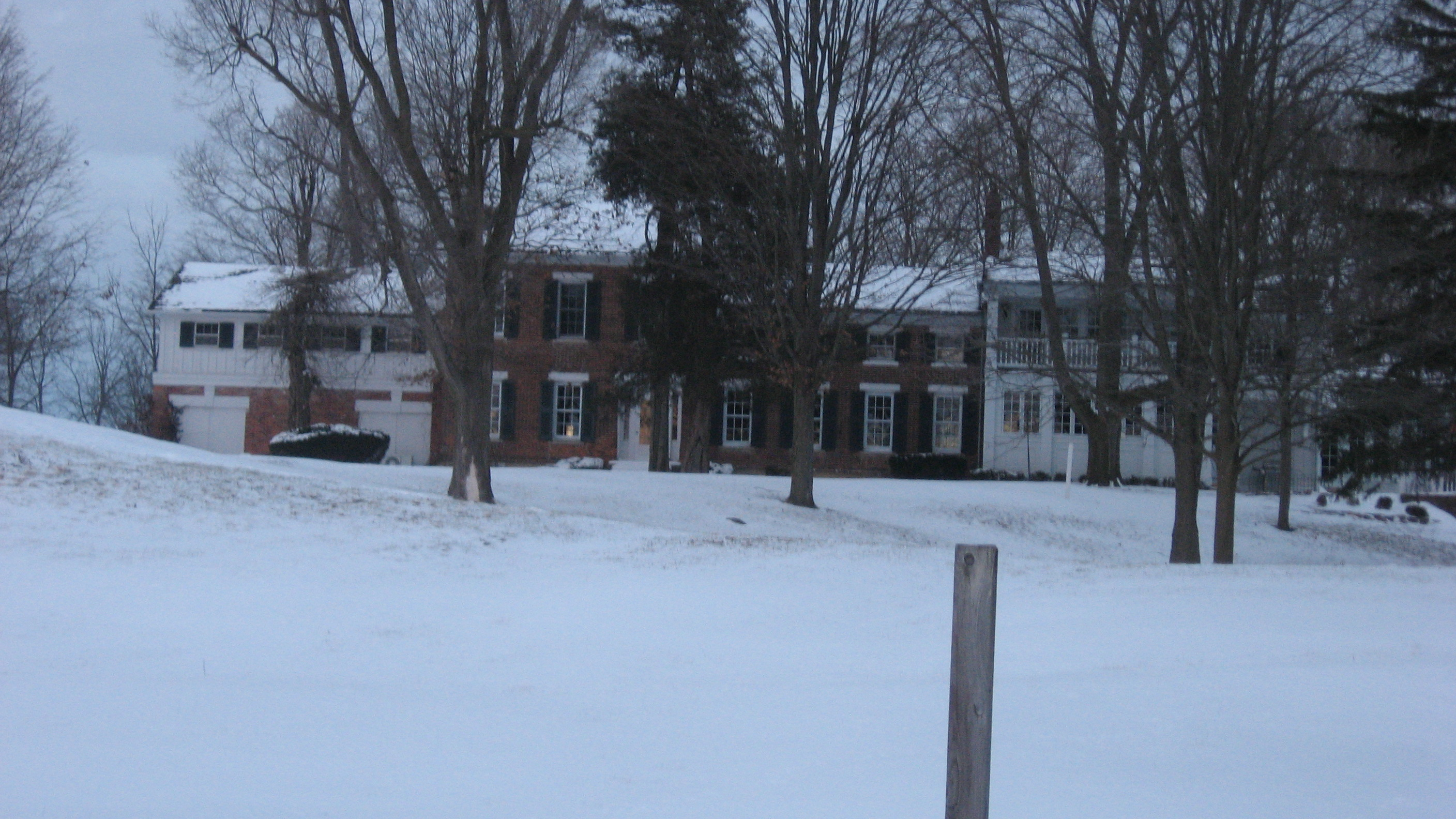
- Vermilyea Inn, January 2014

- Location within Indiana Location within the United States
- Location: 13501 Redding Dr., southwest of Fort Wayne, Aboite Township, Allen County, Indiana
- Coordinates: 41°00′46″N 85°19′04″W
- Area: 20 acres (8.1 ha)
- Built: 1839
- Built by: Vermilyea, Jeese; et.al.
- Architectural style: Federal
- NRHP reference No.: 05001365
- Added to NRHP: December 6, 2005

Vermilyea Inn Historic District is a national historic district located near Fort Wayne in Aboite Township, Allen County, Indiana. The district encompasses one contributing building, the Jesse Vermilyea House, and three contributing structures. The house was built in 1839, and is a two-story, three-bay, Federal style brick dwelling. It has an original two-story, four-bay, gable roofed wing, a 1 1/2-story wood and brick garage addition built about 1945, and a 1 1/2-story brick addition built about 2000. The other contributing resources are the visible earthworks of the Wabash and Erie Canal and the timber platform of the canal aqueduct. Its builder, Jesse Vermilyea, opened his house as an inn and tavern and operated as such through the 19th century.

The district was listed on the National Register of Historic Places in 2005.
