= Wabash and Erie Canal =

Disused canal in Indiana

Coordinates: 40°35′28.6″N 86°40′49.6″W

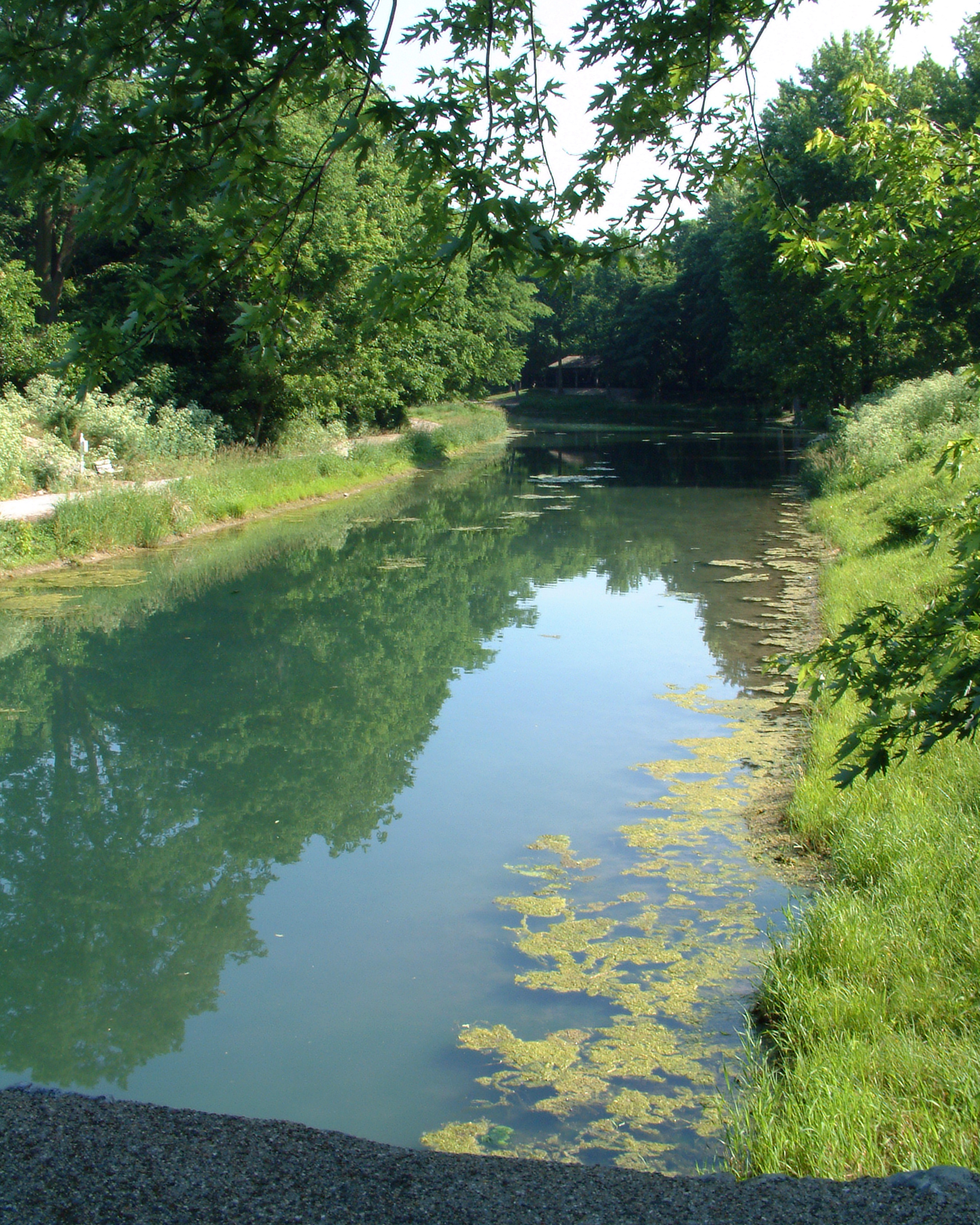
- A restored section of canal in Delphi, Indiana

- Location within Indiana

Indiana Register of Historic Sites

The Wabash and Erie Canal was a shipping canal that linked the Great Lakes to the Ohio River via an artificial waterway. Over 460 miles long, it was the longest canal ever built in North America.

The canal known as the Wabash & Erie in the 1850s and thereafter, was actually a combination of four canals: the Miami and Erie Canal from the Maumee River near Toledo, Ohio, to Junction, Ohio, the original Wabash and Erie Canal from Junction to Terre Haute, Indiana, the Cross Cut Canal from Terre Haute, Indiana, to Worthington, Indiana (Point Commerce), and the Central Canal from Worthington to Evansville, Indiana.

== Construction ==
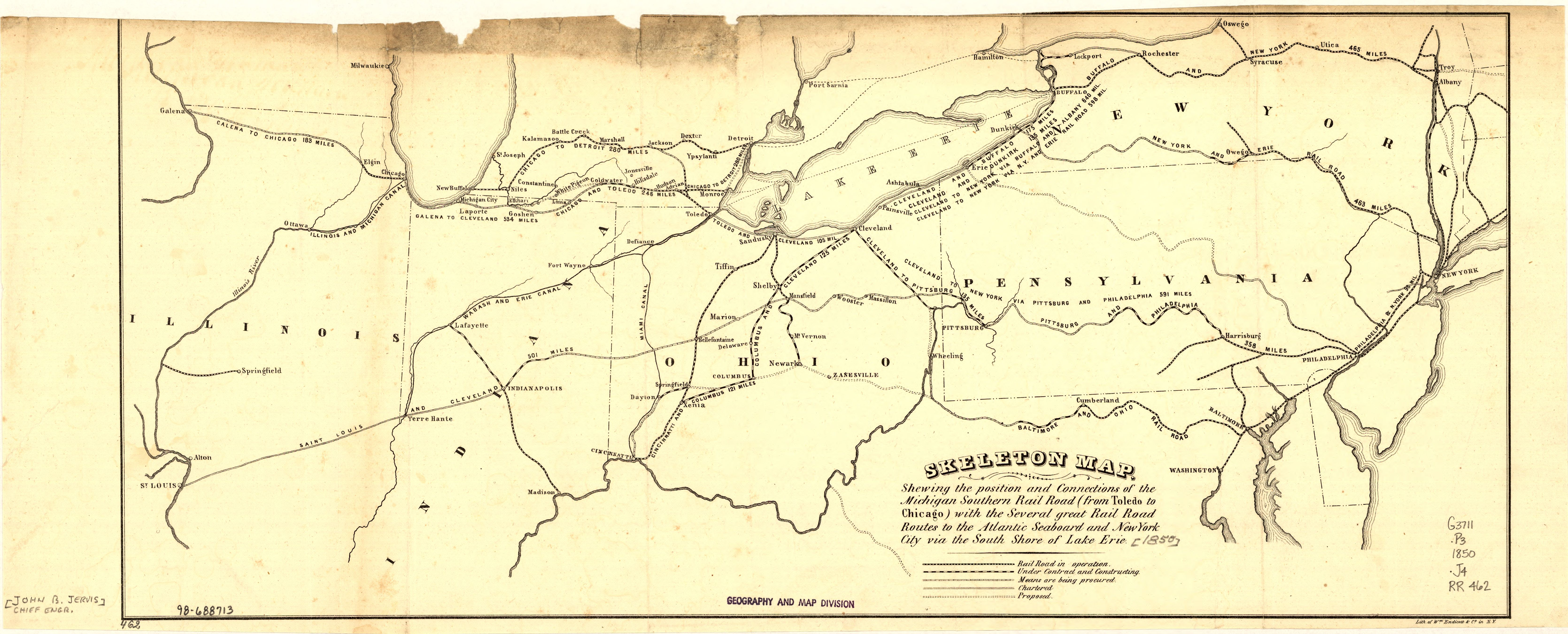
In this 1850 map, the original Wabash and Erie Canal is shown as part of an emerging system of canals and rail lines
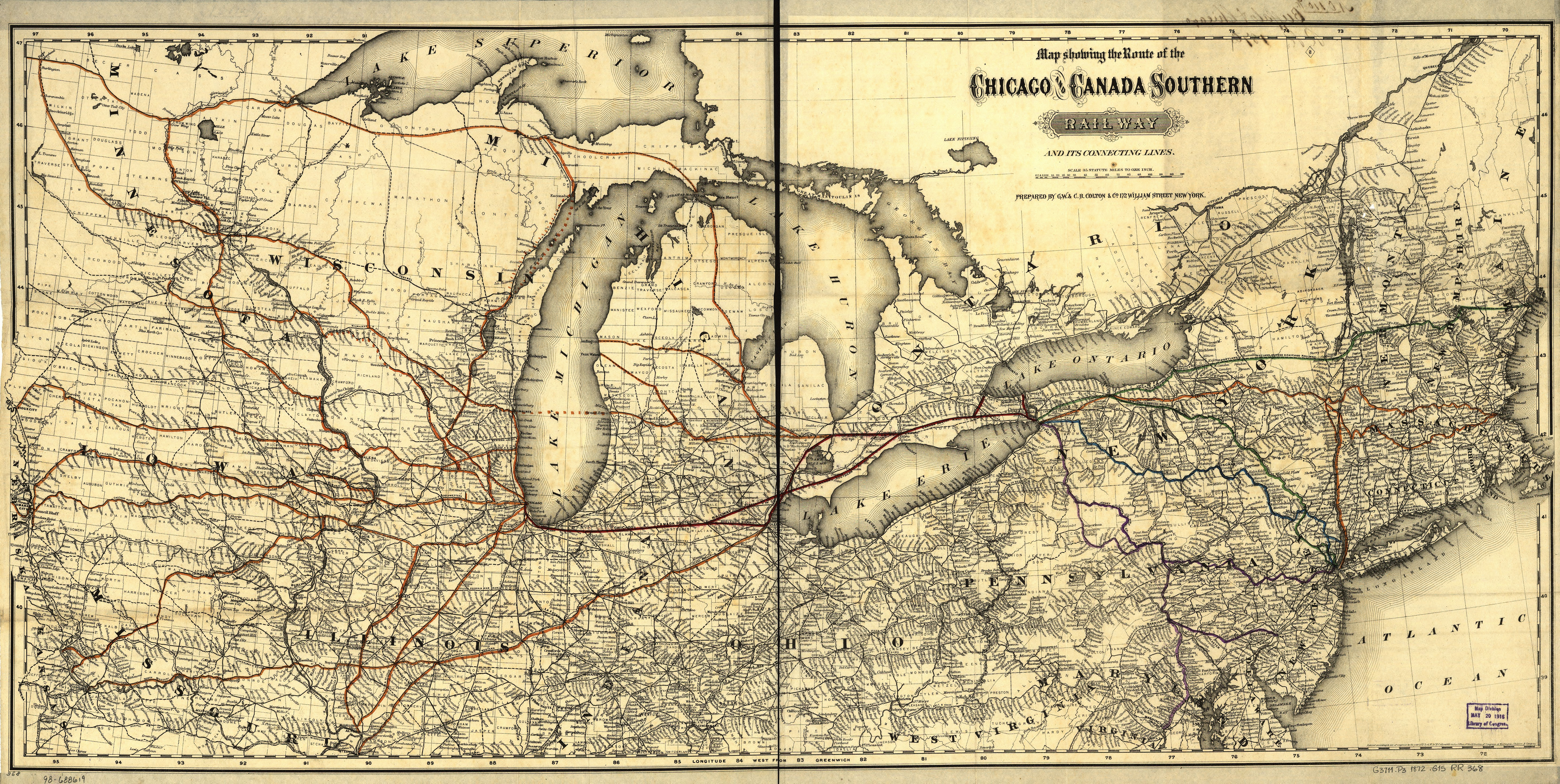
by 1872, the Toledo, Wabash and Western Railway (shown in red) connected Toledo, Fort Wayne, and Lafayette. The original canal, with its slow pace and maintenance issues, struggled to compete with many rail lines in operation in the 1870s.

The United States Congress provided a land grant on March 2, 1827, for the canal's construction. On January 5, 1828, the Indiana General Assembly accepted the grant and appointed three commissioners. These commissioners concluded that the canal would have to extend into Ohio and petitioned that state to appoint a commission of their own. The state legislature approved the plan and new commissioners appointed. After several legislative battles begun by proponents of the railroad, the Indiana General Assembly approved the borrowing of $200,000 to begin construction. On February 22, 1832, ground was broken and construction began. Construction of the canal reached Logansport by 1837. The Panic of 1837 devastated Indiana's program of internal improvements, but did not stop construction entirely. The canal reached Lafayette by 1843, Terre Haute by 1848 and Evansville by 1853. During the summer of 1991, the Gronauer Lock was uncovered at New Haven, Indiana, during the construction of I-469. This is the only intact wooden timber lock discovered. Part of the Gronauer Lock is now on display at the Indiana State Museum.

The high-line sections of the canal proved to be high maintenance and the cost of their repair is what eventually led to the collapse of the canal company. The worst offender was the common muskrat which were plentiful in the area. They would build burrows in the sides of the canal walls and once they tunneled through on the opposite side the water quickly washed out the entire wall of the levee which rendered the canal useless until it could be repaired.

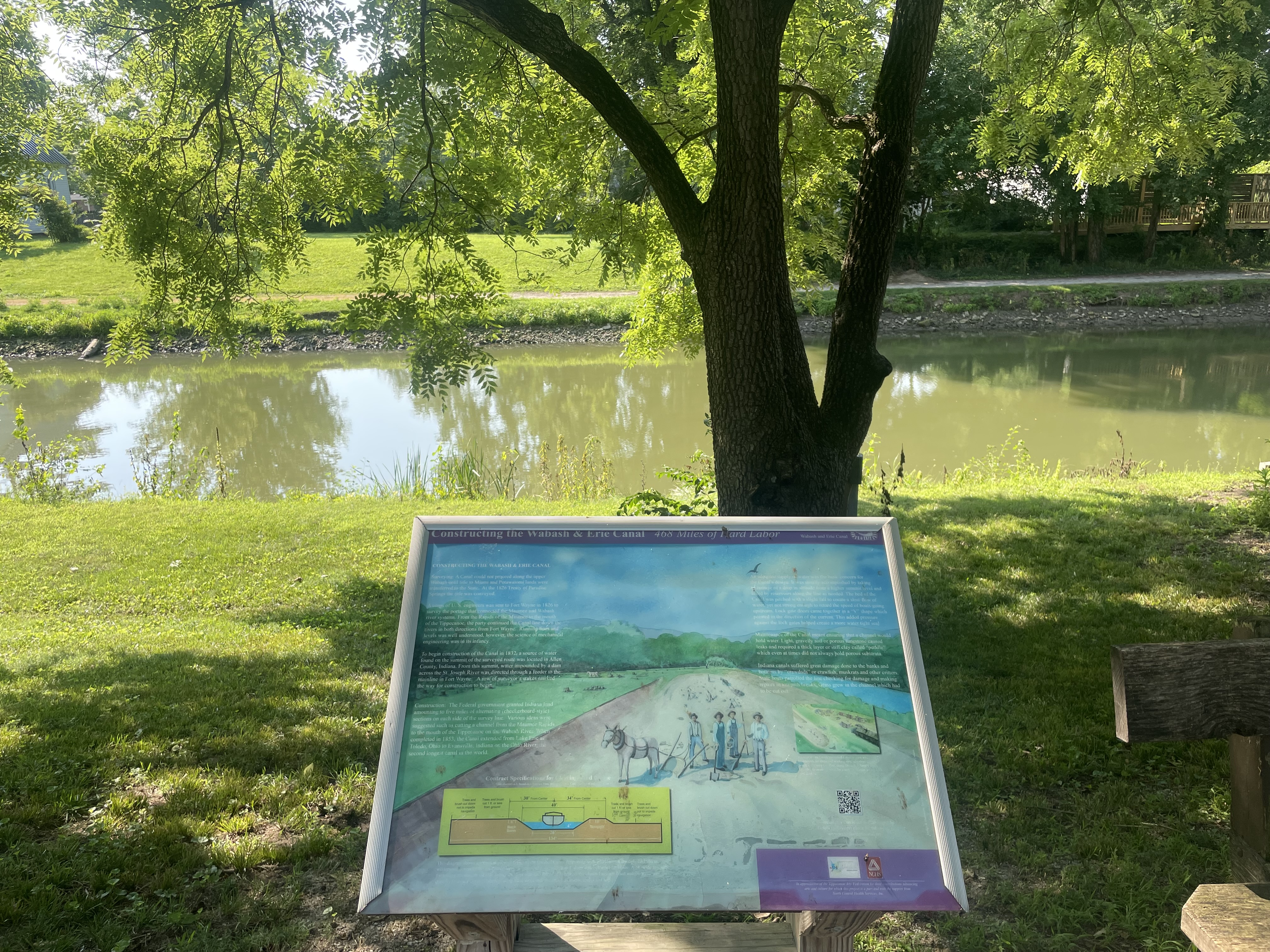
Historical signage in Delphi discussing construction of the canal during the early-mid 1800s. A Towpath trail is visible in the background.

== Operation ==
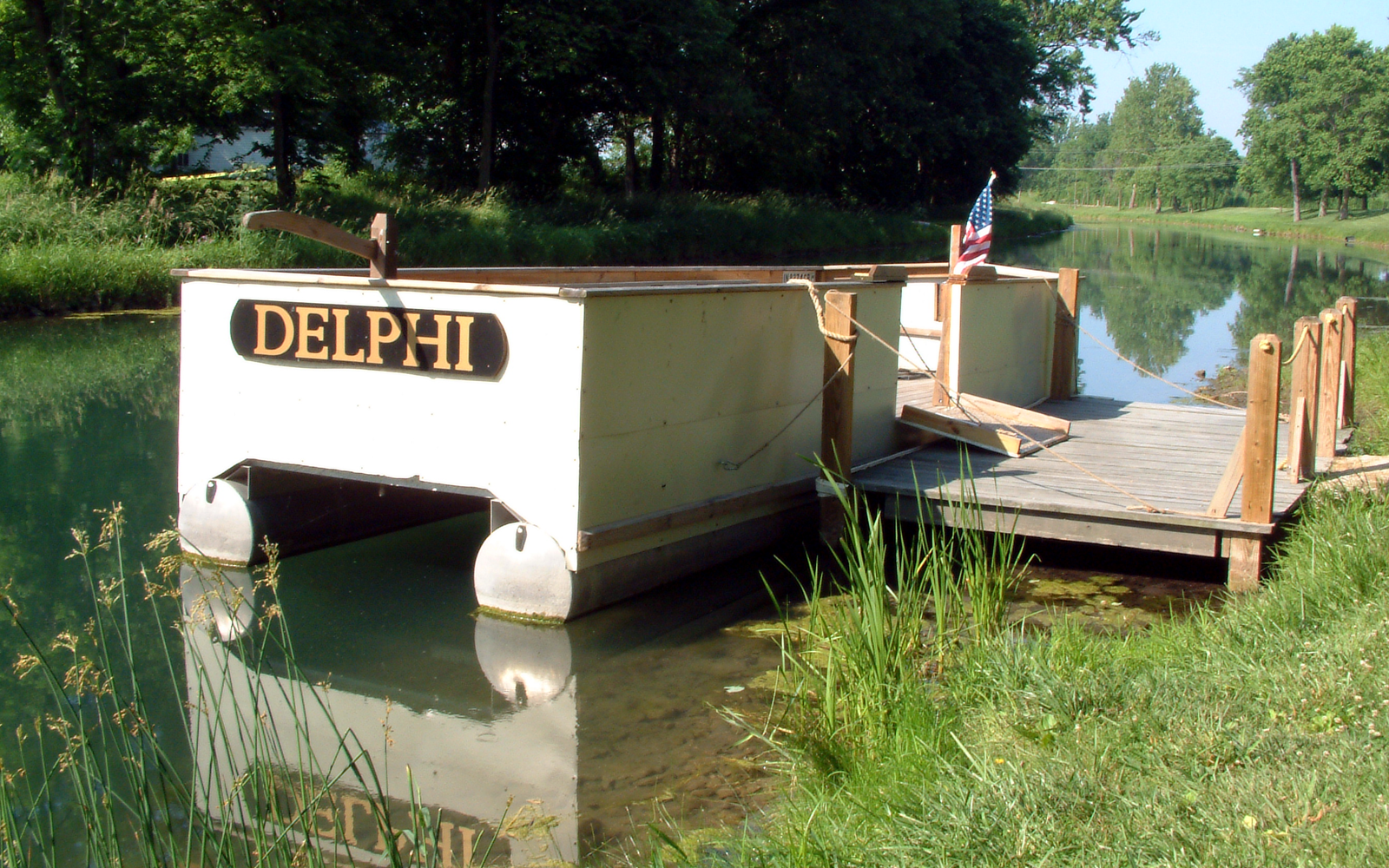
A boat on the canal in Delphi.

The canal began operation in the summer of 1843. It only operated for about a decade before it became apparent that the canal was not economically viable. Even when canal boats were operated at extremely slow speeds, the banks rapidly eroded, and the canal had to be constantly dredged to be operable. Terre Haute, Indiana housed the headquarters of the canal from 1847 through 1876, when the canal lands were sold at an auction conducted by resident trustee Thomas Dowling at the Vigo County Courthouse.

The last canalboat on the Wabash Canal made its last docking in 1874 in Huntington, Indiana; other sections shut down years earlier. In 1887, Paulding County, Ohio, residents put the final nail in the canal system's coffin: unhappy with mosquitoes breeding in the stagnant waters of Six Mile Reservoir, they cut the dike and drained it in the Reservoir war. There were several other "reservoir wars" during the canal's colorful history over the same issue, including the Clay County Canal War in Indiana.

The right-of-way through Fort Wayne was purchased by the New York, Chicago and Lake Erie Railway (the Nickel Plate Road) which ran from Buffalo to Chicago. This allowed the railway to run straight through the heart of a major midwestern city without razing a single home. The canal right-of-way was also directly adjacent to downtown, which made the new railway quite convenient for passengers and many businesses. The canal from Napoleon to Toledo was paved over to make U.S. Route 24.

== Route ==
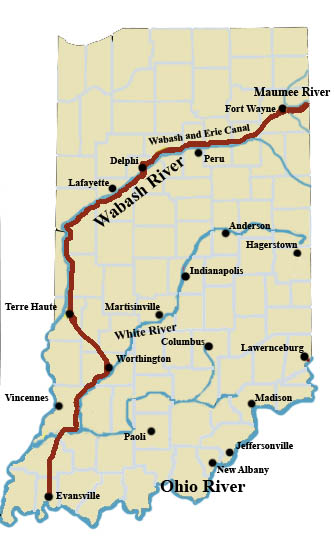
The Wabash and Erie canal in Indiana.

The Wabash & Erie Canal travels 497 miles (800 km) from Toledo, Ohio, on Lake Erie to Evansville, Indiana, on the Ohio River. Its route takes it along the left bank or north side of the Maumee River from Toledo to the south side right bank near Defiance, Ohio, and eventually to the headwaters at Fort Wayne, Indiana. From here, it follows the historic Indian portage to the Wabash River. Following the Wabash River, again on its north side, this is now the right bank. The canal heads downstream to Delphi. At this location, it crosses to the left bank (eastside). Continuing down the Wabash to Terre Haute, the canal turns southeast from the Wabash, using several other riverways, including the West fork of the White and Patoka Rivers until reaching the Ohio River in Evansville, using Pigeon Creek.

=== Maumee River Section ===
The Miami and Erie Canal runs from Toledo to Cincinnati. The route as far as the Napoleon Bend was used by the Wabash & Erie Canal to reach Lake Erie. The joint route includes the following towns and cities.

Toledo, Bend View Metro park (towpath), Side Cut Metro park (towpath & 3 of 6 locks). Providence (operating canal section).

Maumee, Waterville, Providence/Grand Rapids (locks and other canal features), Independence.

Defiance At Defiance, the Miami and Erie Canal crossed the Maumee River and turned south up the Auglaize River. At Junction, Ohio, a split occurred. Southward, the Miami and Erie Canal continued to the divide with the Great Miami and eventually the Ohio River at Cincinnati. Meanwhile, the Wabash & Erie Canal continued west along the Maumee River to the portage at Fort Wayne, Indiana.

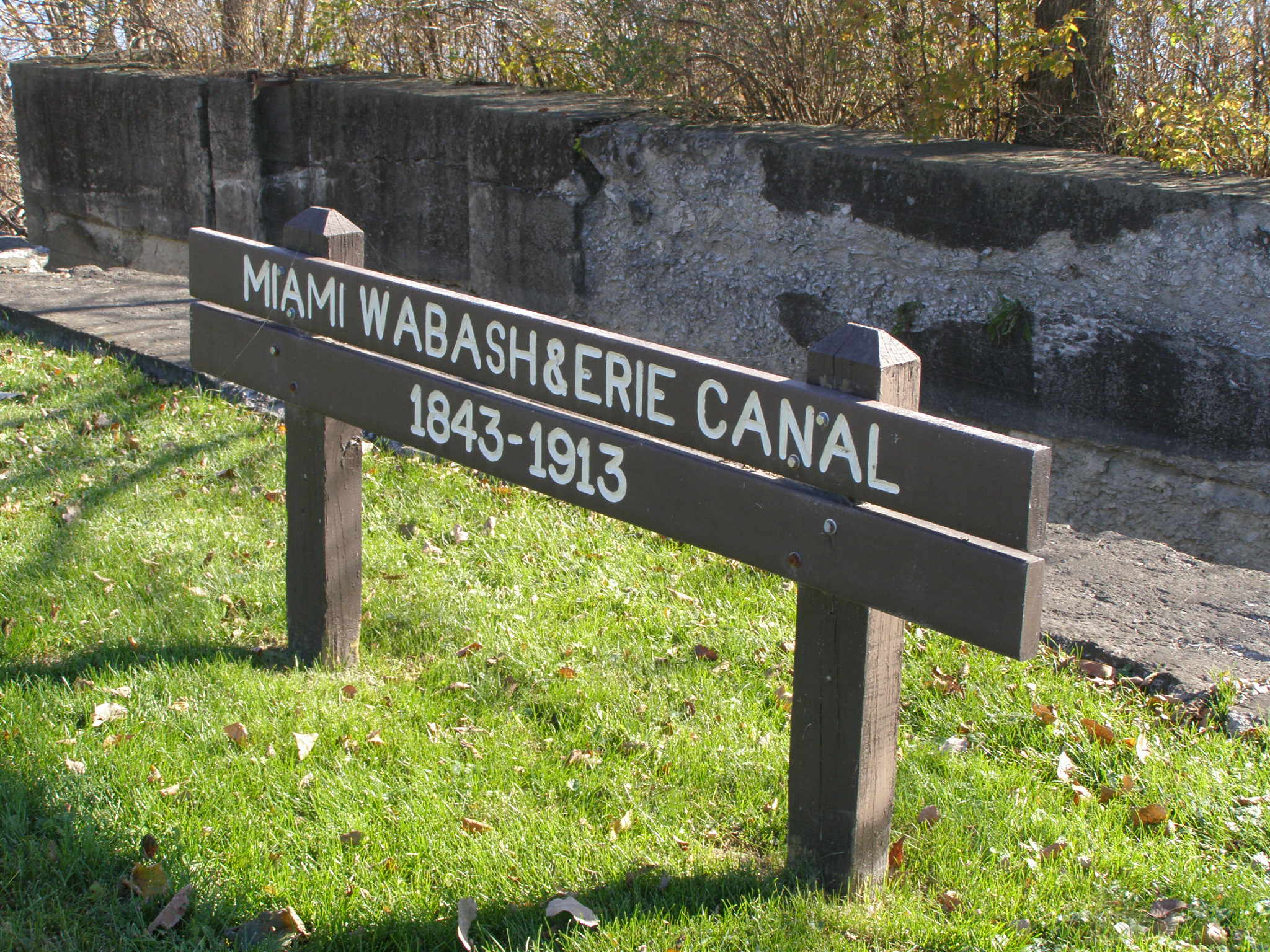
Two canals using the same infrastructure at Providence, Ohio.

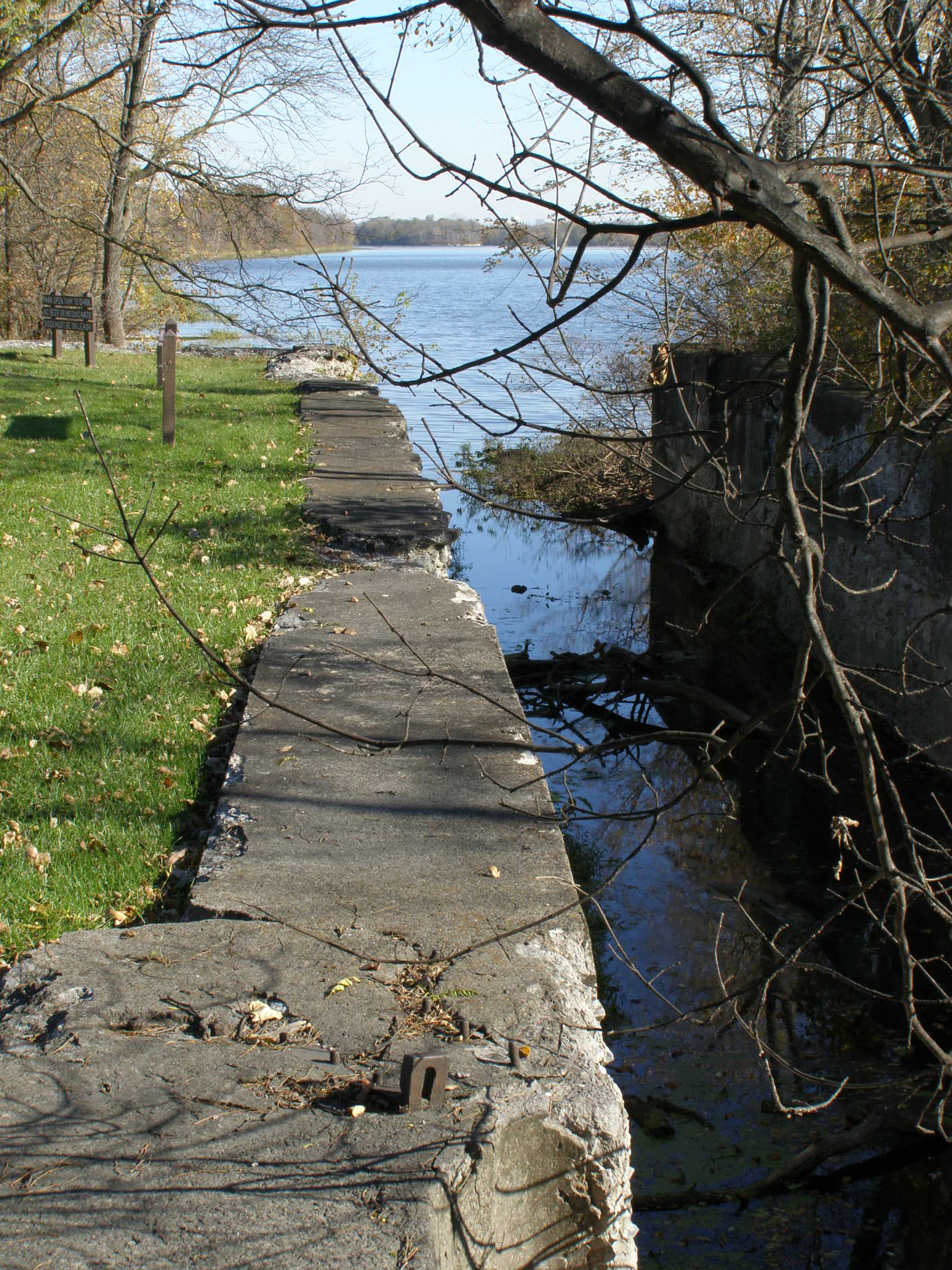
Entrance from the Maumee River to the Miami and Erie

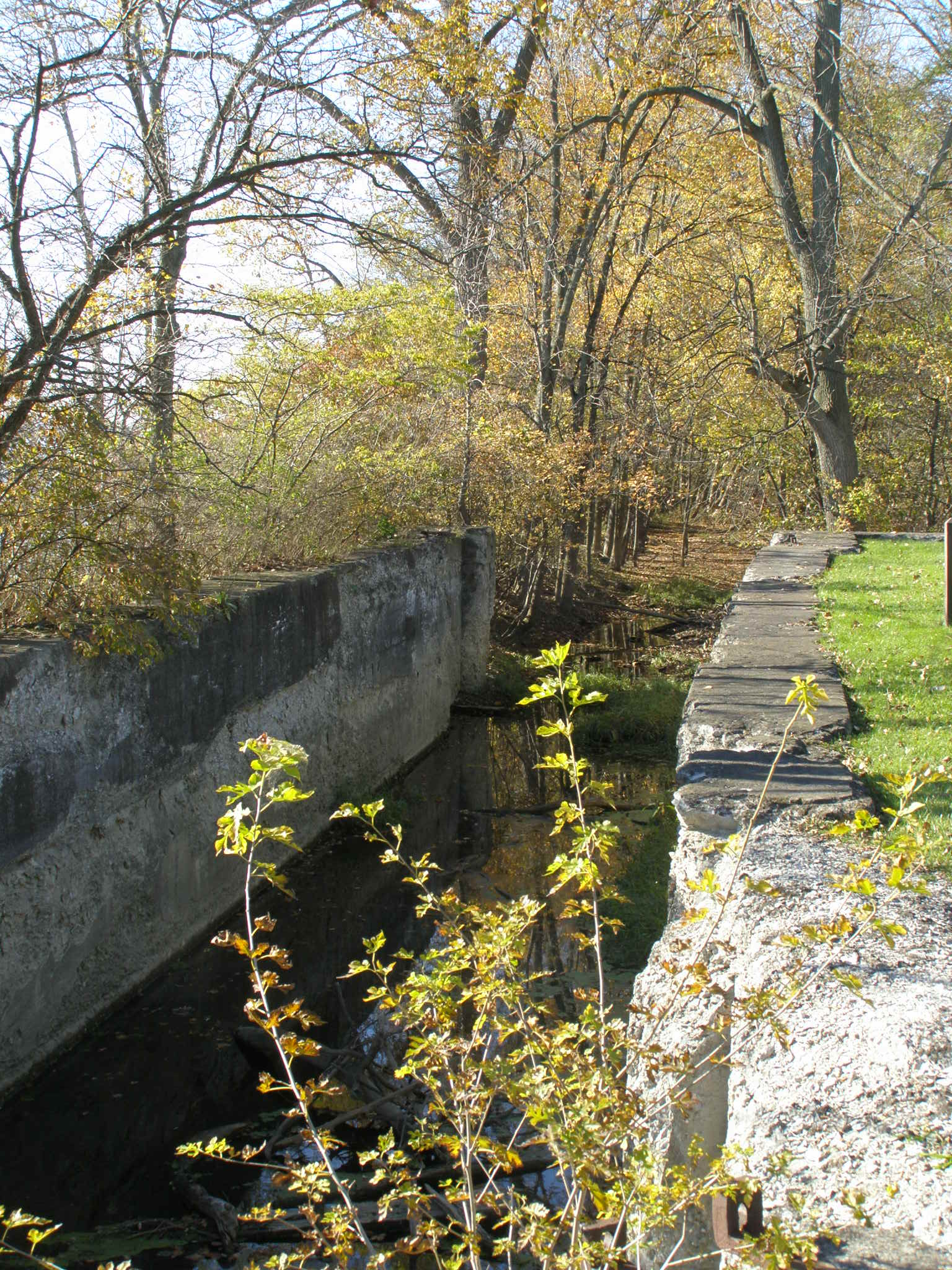
Providence lock looking west into the old canal bed.

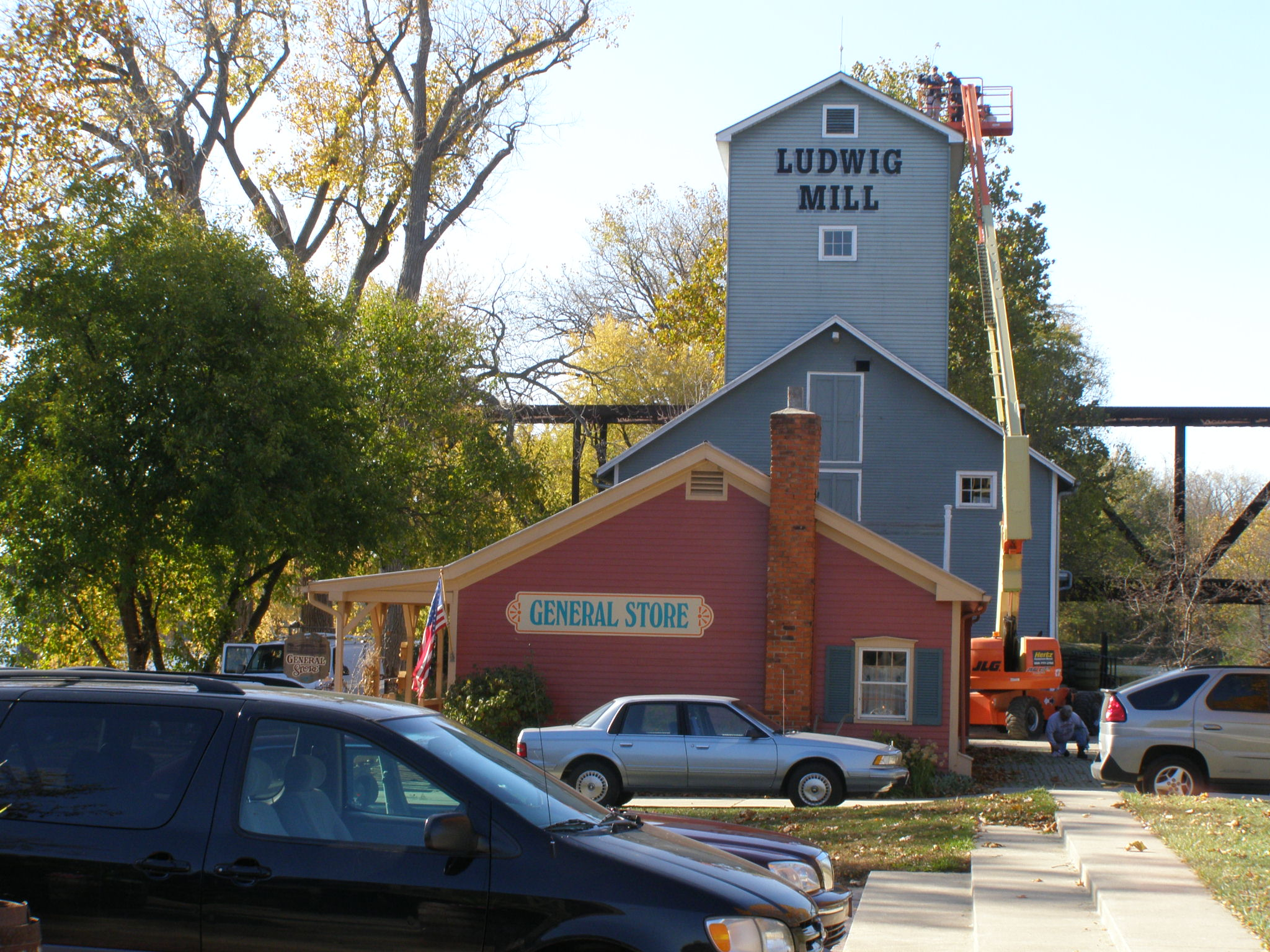
Restoration of the mill and store at Providence.

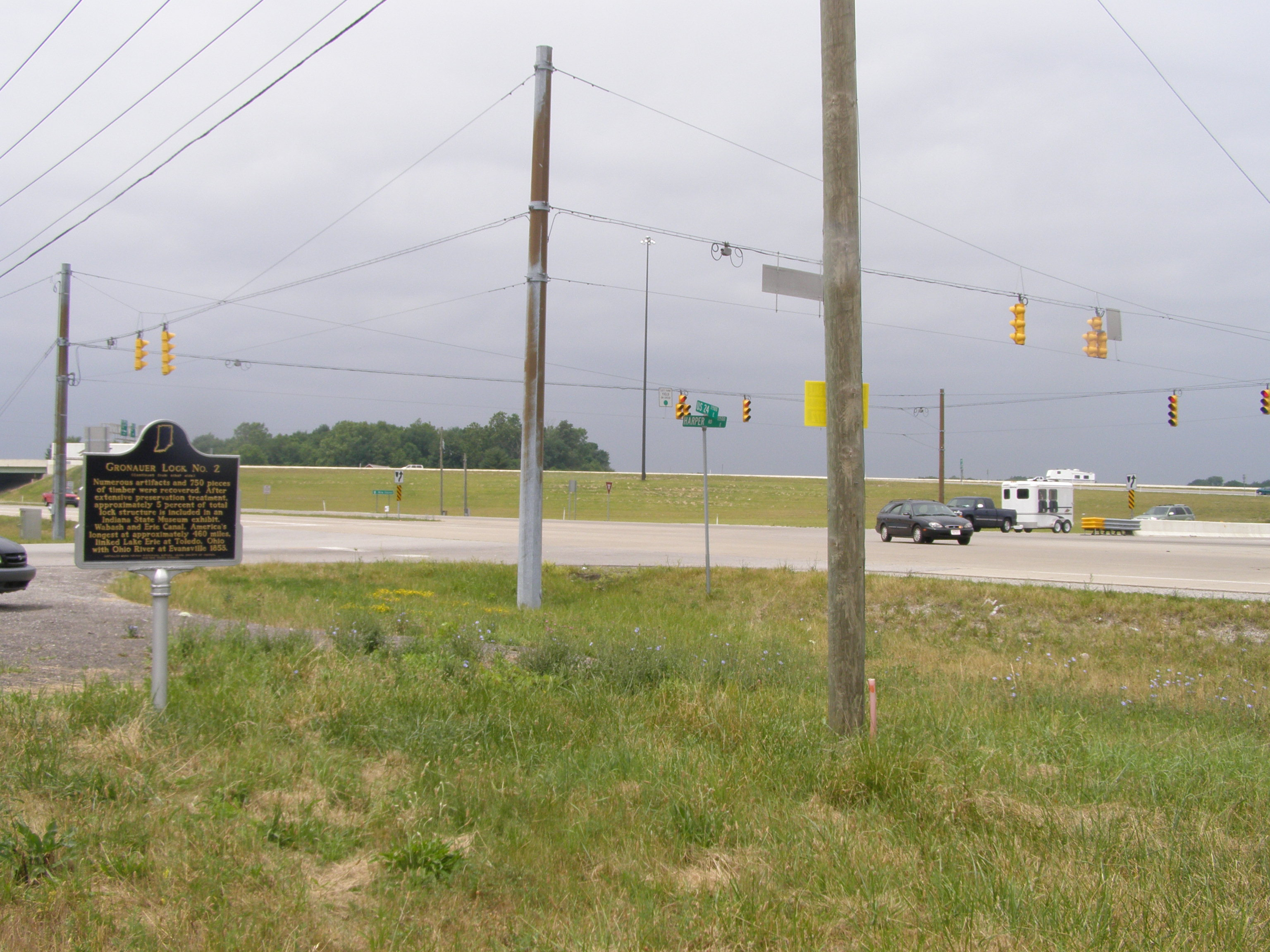
Location of Gronauer Lock #2.

==== New Haven-Indiana ====
Gronauer Lock No 2 "Wabash and Erie Canal lock was discovered here June 1991 during excavation for highway construction. It was built 1838–1840 by Henry Lotz and named for lock keeper Joseph Gronauer. The rare, well-preserved timber-frame design lock measured 115 by 40 feet (35 by 12 m); lock chamber was 90 by 15 feet (27.4 by 4.6 m); two-thirds of the total structure was excavated and removed."

"Numerous artifacts and 750 pieces of timber were recovered. After extensive preservation treatment, approximately 5 percent of total lock structure is included in an Indiana State Museum Exhibit. Wabash and Erie Canal, America's longest at approximately 460 miles (740 km), linked Lake Erie at Toledo, Ohio with Ohio River at Evansville 1853."

After the lock was moved to the Indiana State Museum in 1992, a historical marker was placed at its location (just east of the interchange of I-469 and US-24). At the same time that the lock was discovered, it was also revealed that a property located on the opposite side of the interchange was used by the keeper of the lock.

In light of INDOT's plans to renovate the I-469 and US-24 interchange, the historical marker has been removed from the location, and most all of the buildings on the lock-keeper's property have been demolished.

Fort Wayne is located at an old portage between the Maumee River and the Wabash River. Here, the canal crossed 5 miles to the Little Wabash River and headed downstream through Indiana. Since this was the highest point on the canal (i.e., the summit), Fort Wayne became known as the "Summit City." Located along this section is the Vermilyea Inn Historic District.

=== Wabash River Section ===
Roanoke – Lock 4 (originally Lock 1) was built between 1834-1835 and is found between the intersections of U.S. 24 & 2nd Street and U.S. 24 & 1st Street. Parts of the arch culvert can still be seen in the creek

Huntington – intersection of North Jefferson Street and East Washington on North Jefferson Street
Canal Landing on Washington Street – The Huntington Landing started 120 feet (37 m) west on Washington St and continued to the lock at Cherry St. The Wabash & Erie canal was 4 feet (1.2 m) deep and 100 feet (30 m) wide as this point. Other locks were at First St. and Byron St. The Canal was completed from Fort Wayne to Huntington on July 3, 1835, and from Toledo to Evansville, 459 miles (739 km), in 1854. The Canal preceded the railroad to Huntington by 20 years, spurring early settlement. The Canal was abandoned in 1873.

Rook House – at the intersection of East Park Drive (U.S. 224) and Warren on East Park Drive. located on the south wall of the building.
The first permanent hotel of Huntington was built of stone on this site by General John Tipton in 1835. Standing on the bank of the Wabash and Erie Canal, it was a commercial, political and social center. From 1862 to 1872 it housed one of the first public schools and was destroyed in 1873.

Forks of the Wabash Park (Museum),

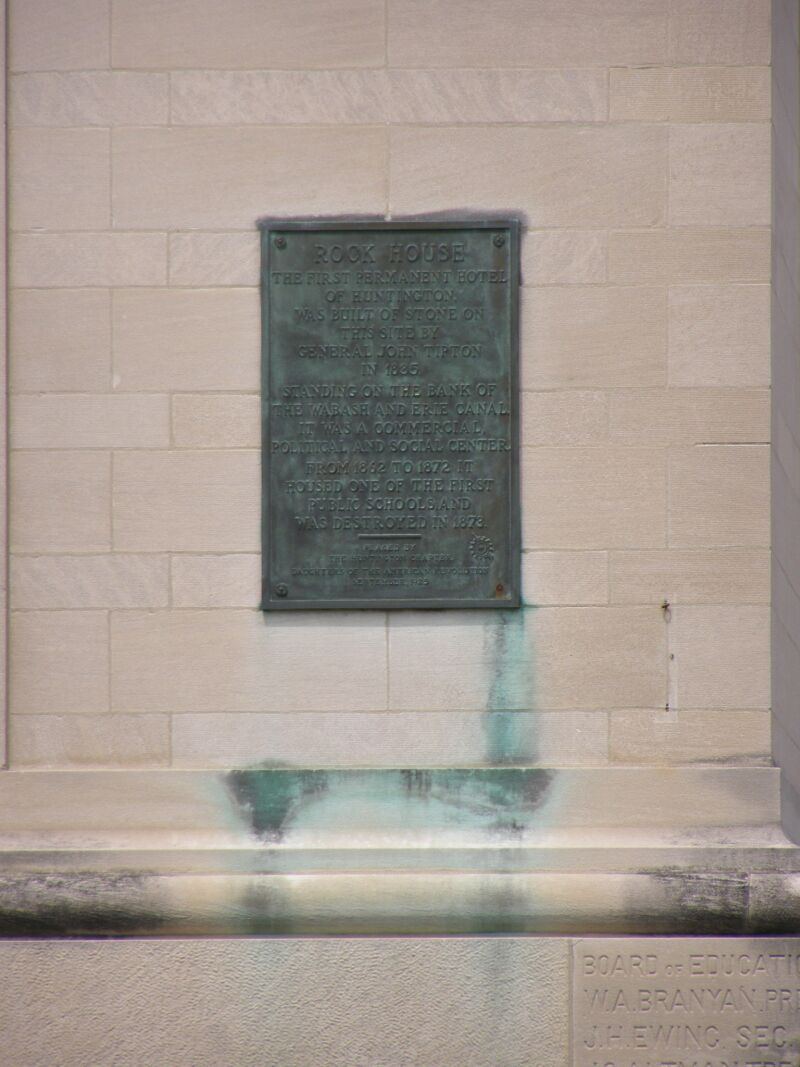
Rook House Marker

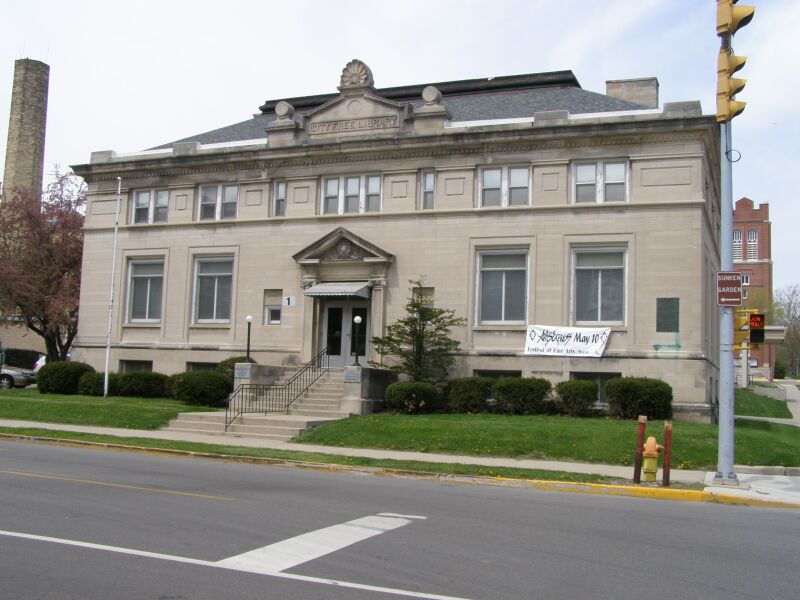
Rook House

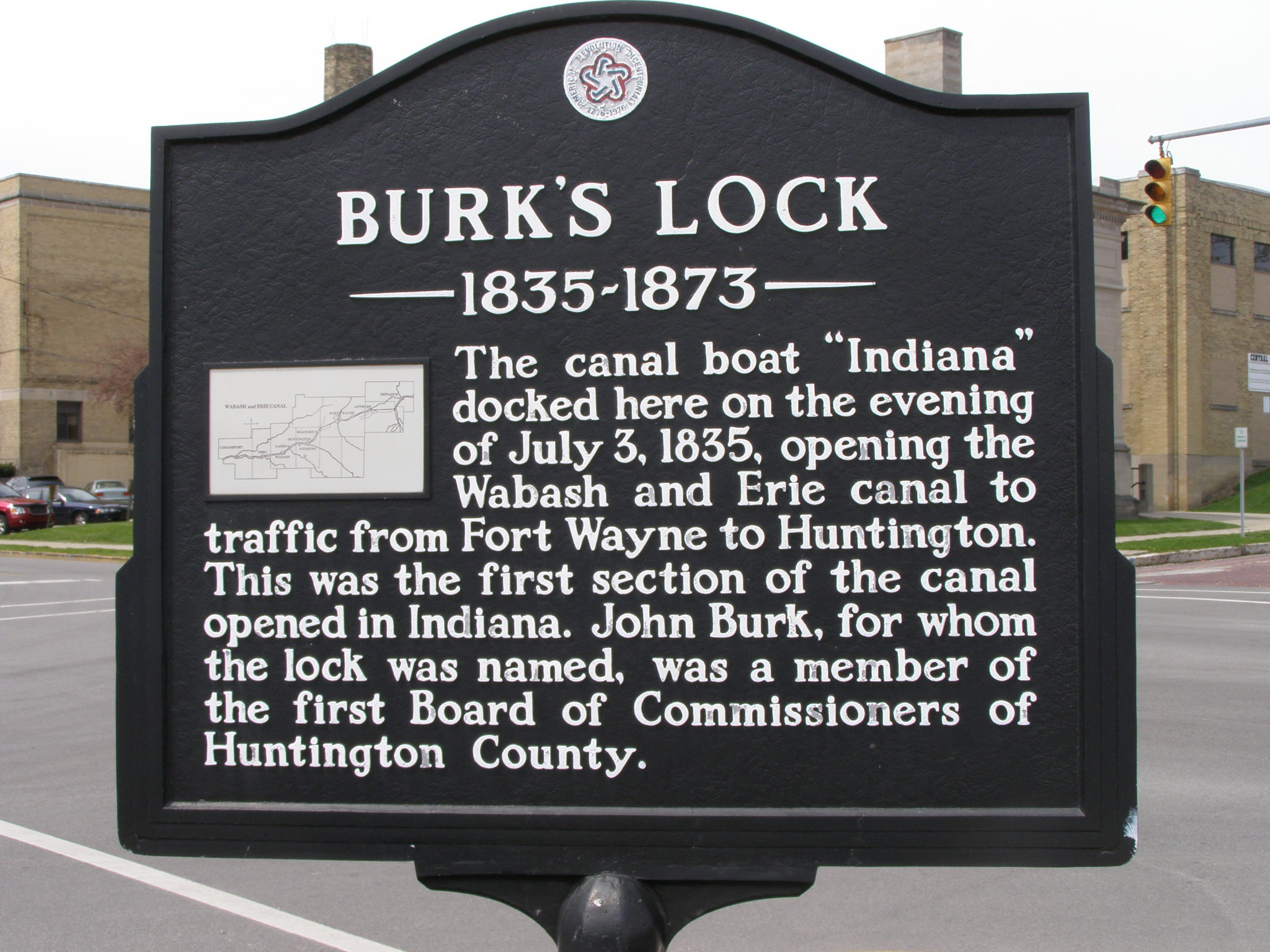
Burks Lock Historic Marker

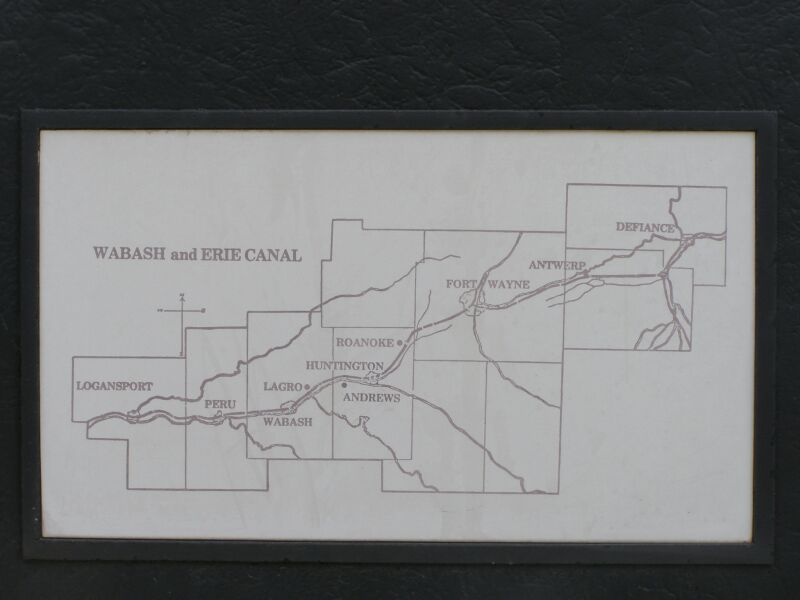
Map of the Wabash & Erie Canal

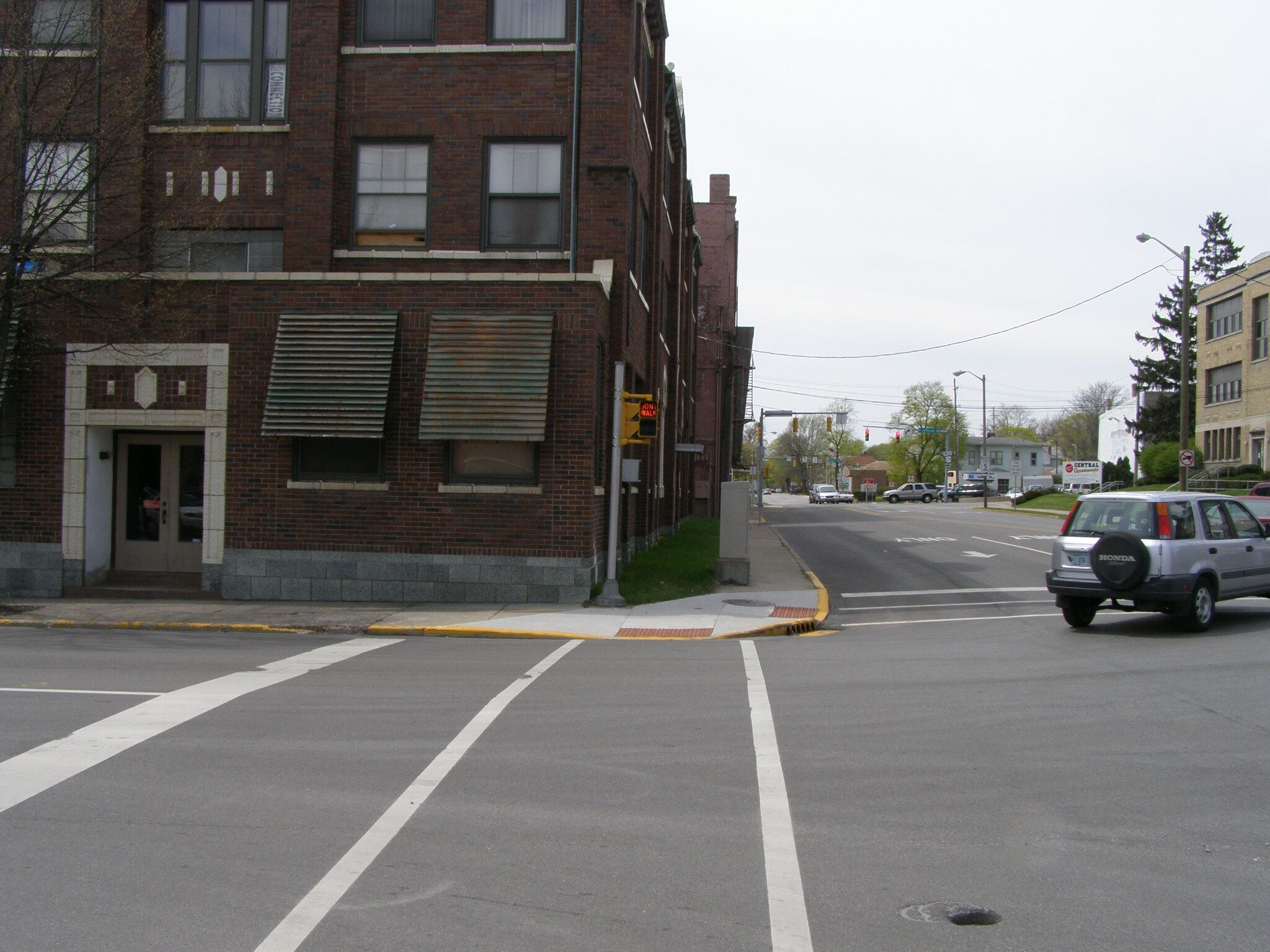
Historic Canal Route, now US 24

Richvalley, Peru, Logansport,

Delphi, In Delphi, the canal crossed the Wabash from the right bank (northside) to the left bank (southside). A dam was built across the Wabash River at Pitts to create a slack water area to allow the boats to cross the river without an aqueduct. The Wabash & Erie Canal Interpretive Center, a re-watered section of the canal, working canal boat, bridge, and mill site welcome visitors.

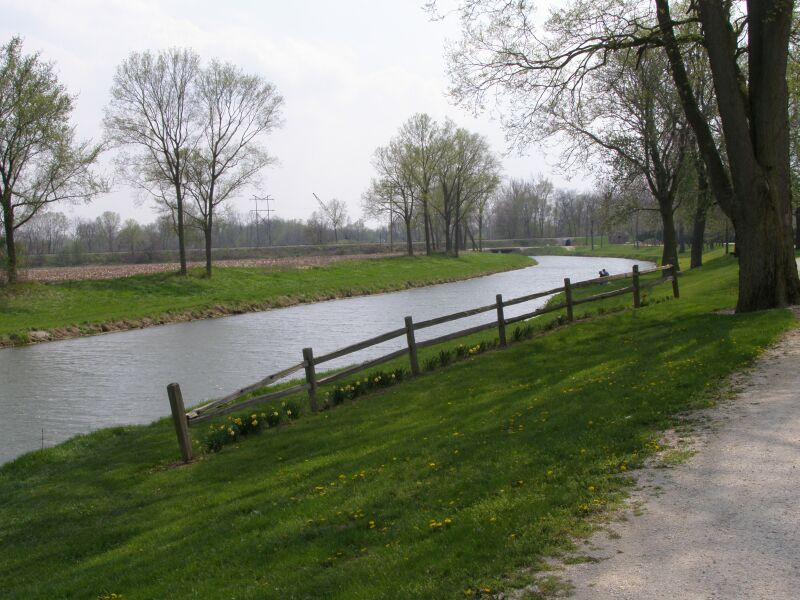
Water section of the canal in Delphi, Indiana

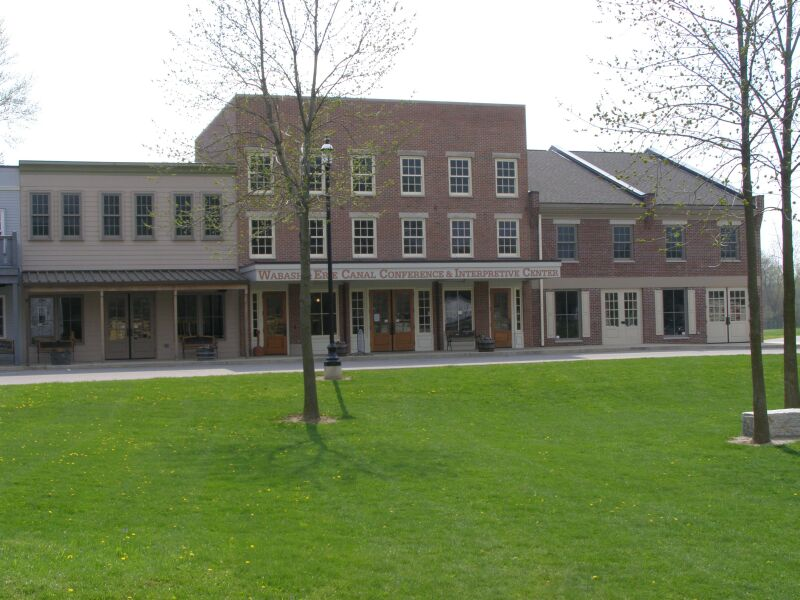
Reconstructed Canal Town - Canal Park Visitor Center

Lafayette, Attica, Fountain County, Covington, Montezuma, Terre Haute

=== Cross Cut Canal Section ===
Eel River Section Between Terre Haute and Worthington, is 42 miles (68 km) long. Legally referred to as the Cross Cut Canal. This created a link to the Central Canal and a route to Evansville. Since no other section of the Cross Cut Canal was contemplated nor built, it is considered historically to be part of the Wabash and Erie Canal. The canal had to overcome the 78 feet (24 m) at the summit. Water was supplied by the Eel River Feeder, the Birch Creek Reservoir and Splunge Creek Reservoir. Work started in 1836 but abandoned in 1839. The project was completed in 1850, serving the Wabash and Erie Canal system until 1861. The Cross Cut Canal is considered to be part of the Wabash & Erie Canal System.

Eel River Feeder Dam is 180 feet (55 m) long and 16.5 feet (5.0 m) high. It was completed in 1839. It was constructed to carry enough water from the river to enable navigation of boats on the proposed Crosscut Canal. The feeder dam was repaired and extended in 1850 to be 264 feet (80 m) long.

Riley, Worthington

=== West Fork of the White River ===
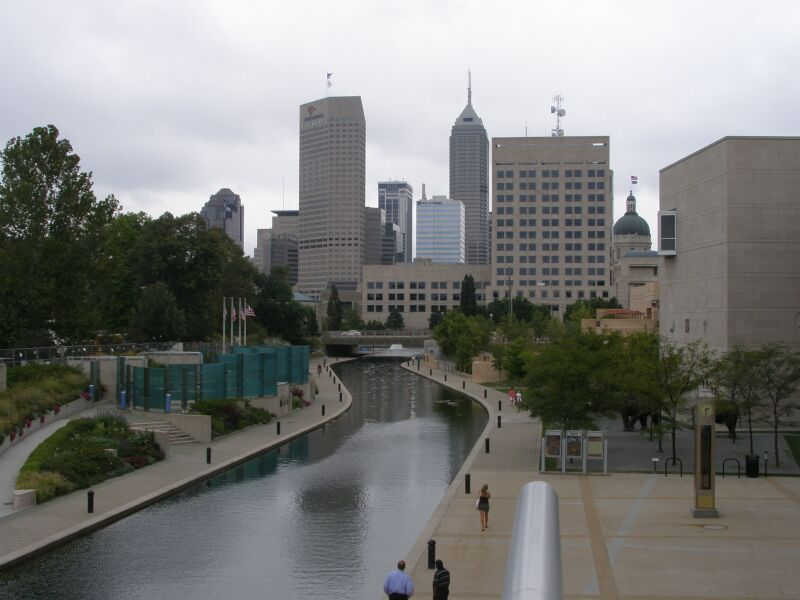
Indiana Central Canal in Indianapolis

From Newberry south, the W&E Canal followed the route of the Central Canal. The Central Canal was planned from Logansport, through Indianapolis and south to Evansville. Only the section from Newberry south and a few miles in Indianapolis were built. Newberry, Edwardsport, Petersburg, Francisco (Pigeon Creek section begins), Evansville, Indiana.

The canal is signed as being crossed by Interstate 64 at the milepost 32 crossing over Pigeon Creek.

== Travel ==
Travel along the canal was accomplished by canal packet boats. Goods were shipped via freight packets. Passenger packets consisted of a series of rooms along their length. Towards the front was the main saloon, where meals were taken. This room was converted at night into a men's dorm for sleeping. The ladies saloon was towards the back of the boat. It was the women's sleeping dorm at night.

Packets were pulled by three horses, oxen, or a mixture of oxen and horses. The most common problems identified in journals of that time were, heat, mosquitoes, and the close proximity to the other passengers.

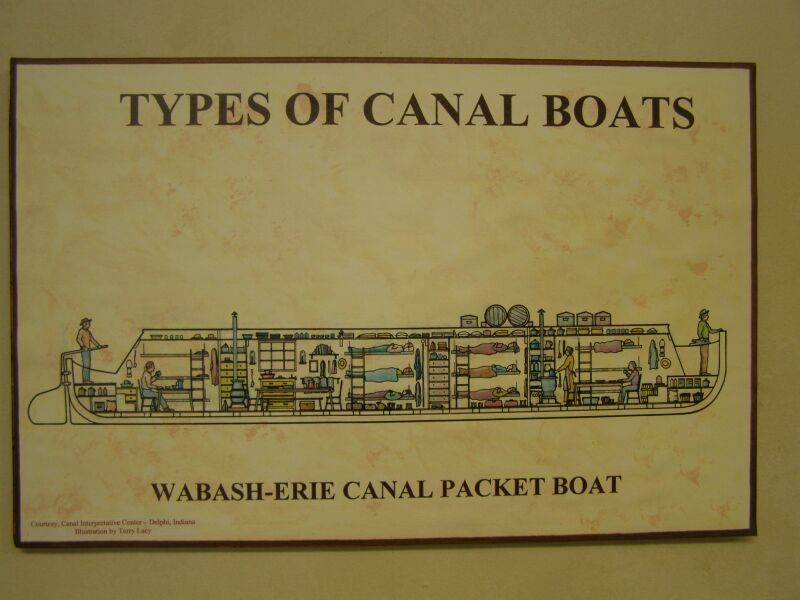
Passenger Packet, courtesy of the Canal Interpretive Center, Delphi, IN

== Museum ==
The Wabash & Erie Canal Interpretive Center is an interpretive center and open-air village located on the banks of the canal in Delphi, Indiana. The interpretive center includes a model canal with a miniature reservoir, aqueduct, lock, and gristmill. The model canal boat Gen. Grant shows the type of boats that carried freight on the canal during its final years of full-scale operation from the 1860s to 1874. The visitor center was opened in 2003.

The interpretive center is operated by the Wabash & Erie Canal Association, a community nonprofit organization dedicated to Indiana's canal heritage. The center serves as a physical focus for enjoyment of a 2.5-mile (4.0 km) segment of the canal that has been rebuilt and reopened as a waterway and parallel towpath. The museum is open daily, and an admission fee is charged.

== See also ==
- Indiana Mammoth Internal Improvement Act
- Indiana Central Canal
- Whitewater Canal
