= Curryville, Sullivan County, Indiana =

Curryville
- Unincorporated community
- Sullivan County's location in Indiana

- Location in Sullivan County, Indiana
- Coordinates: 39°11′13″N 87°23′33″W
- Country: United States
- State: Indiana
- County: Sullivan
- Township: Curry
- Elevation: 531 ft (162 m)
- Time zone: UTC-5 (Eastern (EST))
  - Summer (DST): UTC-4 (EDT)
- ZIP code: 47879
- Area codes: 812, 930
- GNIS feature ID: 433256

Curryville is an unincorporated community in Curry Township, Sullivan County, in the U.S. state of Indiana.

The community is part of the Terre Haute Metropolitan Statistical Area.

== History ==
A post office was established at Curryville in 1840, and remained in operation until it was discontinued in 1861.

Sullivan County's first underground coal mine was opened in Curryville, on farmland belonging to Indiana Supreme Court justice, James Hanna.

== Geography ==
Curryville is located at 39°11′13″N 87°23′33″W.
