= Curry Township, Sullivan County, Indiana =

Curry Township
- Township
- Location in Sullivan County
- Coordinates: 39°12′51″N 87°23′56″W
- Country: United States
- State: Indiana
- County: Sullivan

Government
  - Type: Indiana township

Area
  - Total: 35.12 sq mi (91.0 km^{2})
  - Land: 34.95 sq mi (90.5 km^{2})
  - Water: 0.17 sq mi (0.44 km^{2}) 0.48%
- Elevation: 545 ft (166 m)

Population (2020)
  - Total: 3,398
  - Density: 97.22/sq mi (37.54/km^{2})
- ZIP codes: 47850, 47879
- GNIS feature ID: 453250

Curry Township is one of nine townships in Sullivan County, Indiana, United States. As of the 2020 census, its population was 3,398 and it contained 1,543 housing units. All three of Terre Haute's television affiliates (WTWO, WTHI, and WAWV) and several radio stations have or share transmitter towers in the northern end of the township just south of Farmersburg.

The township is named after William Curry, who was the area's first settler when he arrived there in 1817 from Kentucky.

Historical population
| Census | Pop. | Note | %± |
|---|---|---|---|
| 1890 | 2,443 | | — |
| 1900 | 2,871 | | 17.5% |
| 1910 | 5,300 | | 84.6% |
| 1920 | 4,798 | | −9.5% |
| 1930 | 4,327 | | −9.8% |
| 1940 | 4,150 | | −4.1% |
| 1950 | 3,872 | | −6.7% |
| 1960 | 3,959 | | 2.2% |
| 1970 | 3,778 | | −4.6% |
| 1980 | 3,988 | | 5.6% |
| 1990 | 3,633 | | −8.9% |
| 2000 | 3,769 | | 3.7% |
| 2010 | 3,559 | | −5.6% |
| 2020 | 3,398 | | −4.5% |
Source: US Decennial Census

== Geography ==
According to the 2010 census, the township has a total area of 35.12 square miles (91.0 km^{2}), of which 34.95 square miles (90.5 km^{2}) (or 99.52%) is land and 0.17 square miles (0.44 km^{2}) (or 0.48%) is water.

=== Cities, towns, villages ===
- Farmersburg
- Shelburn

=== Unincorporated towns ===
- Baldridge at 39.223096°N 87.372241°W
- Curryville at 39.186985°N 87.392519°W
- East Shelburn at 39.174486°N 87.379741°W
- Standard at 39.19643°N 87.389186°W
- Wilfred at 39.186708°N 87.352518°W

(This list is based on USGS data and may include former settlements.)

=== Adjacent townships ===
- Linton Township, Vigo County (north)
- Pierson Township, Vigo County (northeast)
- Jackson Township (east)
- Hamilton Township (south)
- Turman Township (southwest)
- Fairbanks Township (west)
- Prairie Creek Township, Vigo County (northwest)

=== Cemeteries ===
The township contains these four cemeteries: Douglas Chapel, Ebenezer, McKinney and West Lawn.

=== Major highways ===
- U.S. Route 41

=== Airports and landing strips ===
- Austin Air Ads Airport

== School districts ==
- Northeast School Corporation

== Political districts ==
- Indiana's 8th congressional district
- State House District 45
- State Senate District 39
