= Spring Hill, Vigo County, Indiana =

Spring Hill
- Unincorporated community
- Vigo County's location in Indiana

- location in Vigo County, Indiana
- Coordinates: 39°24′45″N 87°22′38″W
- Country: United States
- State: Indiana
- County: Vigo
- Township: Honey Creek
- Elevation: 554 ft (169 m)
- Time zone: UTC-5 (Eastern (EST))
  - Summer (DST): UTC-4 (EDT)
- ZIP code: 47874
- Area code: 765
- GNIS feature ID: 443982

Spring Hill is an unincorporated community in Honey Creek Township, Vigo County, in the U.S. state of Indiana.

It is part of the Terre Haute metropolitan area.

== Geography ==
Spring Hill is located at 39°24′45″N 87°22′38″W at an elevation of 554 feet.
