= Walter Bullock =

American screenwriter

- Born: May 6, 1907; Shelburn, Indiana, U.S.
- Died: August 19, 1953 (aged 46); Los Angeles, California
- Education: DePauw University
- Occupations: Song lyricist, screenwriter

Walter Bullock (May 6, 1907, in Shelburn, Indiana – August 19, 1953, in Los Angeles, California) was an American song lyricist and screenwriter. He recorded with his brother, James Russell Lowell Bullock. On April 22, 1930, they released a record on the Champion label (16004). Side A was "I'm Satisfied With My Girl" and side B was "He Man Chew Tobacco".

After graduating from DePauw University, Bullock started writing for Hollywood in 1936 and was to collaborate with many film composers. In 1936, he had two successes with Magnolias in the Moonlight with music by Victor Schertzinger, and When Did You Leave Heaven? with Richard A. Whiting.

He was nominated for two Academy Awards. He was a distant generational relative of voice actor, S. Scott Bullock.

== Selected filmography ==
- The Gang's All Here (1943)
- Repeat Performance (1947)
- Out of the Blue (1947)
- Adventures of Casanova (1948)
- Golden Girl (1951)
- The Farmer Takes a Wife (1953)
- The I Don't Care Girl (1953)
