= Allendale, Indiana =

- Unincorporated community
- Vigo County's location in Indiana

- Allendale's location in Vigo County, Indiana
- Coordinates: 39°23′30″N 87°23′45″W
- Country: United States
- State: Indiana
- County: Vigo
- Township: Honey Creek
- Elevation: 554 ft (169 m)

Population (2000)
  - Total: 250
- Time zone: UTC-5 (Eastern (EST))
  - Summer (DST): UTC-4 (EDT)
- ZIP code: 47802
- Area codes: 812, 930
- FIPS code: 18-1054
- GNIS feature ID: 430096

Allendale is an unincorporated community in south central Vigo County, Indiana, United States, in Honey Creek Township. It is part of the Terre Haute Metropolitan Statistical Area.

== History ==
Allendale, built into a bluff overlooking Honey Creek, is known for its winding roads, heavily wooded lots, deep ravines and large houses. Most of the architect-designed homes date from the 1920s to 1960s and display a range of styles -- Prairie School, Arts & Crafts, Jacobean Revival, Colonial Revival, Cotswold Cottage, Mission Revival, Cape Cod, Split-Level and Ranch. Allendale adjoins the Country Club of Terre Haute; a private, non-profit, member-owned 18-hole golf course started in 1898. A Carmelite Monastery, The Carmel of St. Joseph, was founded in Allendale in 1947. The modern chapel was completed in 1970.

Allendale was once part of a farm owned by industrialist William P. Ijams and his wife, Sallie Warren Ijams. Warren Park Farm included a 100-horse stable. In 1889, a syndicate headed by Ijams bought Axtell, a world record setting harness racing stallion, for $105,000. It was the highest price ever paid for a horse at the time. The Ijams' son, Frank Burch Ijams, commissioned New York architect H.T. Lindeberg, a student of Stanford White, to build a Jacobean Revival mansion in Allendale in 1929.

Another former Allendale resident was Chapman J. Root, who owned the Root Glass Company of Terre Haute. Root Glass designed and patented the famous Coca-Cola contour bottle. Root's Allendale estate, Rocky Edge, included a party house with an indoor swimming pool, greenhouse, bar and ballroom.

Allendale was also the home of distiller, Fred B. Smith. After establishing a successful distillery in Nebraska, Smith relocated to Terre Haute in 1895 and organized the Indiana Distilling Co. and later managed the 6-story Majestic Distillery, one of the world's largest, with a capacity of 60,000 gallons a day. In 1898 Smith founded the Merchants Distilling Co. The gardens of Fred B. Smith's Prairie School mansion in Allendale were designed by the Danish-born landscape architect, Jens Jensen, and included a reflection pool and 'long view' meadow. After the 18th Amendment to the Constitution was ratified prohibiting the sale, manufacture, and transportation of alcohol, Smith closed the distillery and sold his Allendale estate, valued at $200,000, to the Indiana Knights of Columbus for $75,000 in 1921. The Knights of Columbus established the Gibault School for Boys on the property.

Allendale was also the location of the Allendale Lodge—a rustic stone and wooden structure with a large fireplace and screened porch. The lodge was built by Indiana State University with the help of the National Youth Administration in 1939. Indiana State University paid for the cost of the building materials and college students provided the labor. Indiana State University sold the Allendale Lodge and surrounding property to the Carmelites in 1999.

Allendale was originally outside of Terre Haute, but retail expansion south of the city has encroached on the area. The population is about 250.
