= Southwood, Indiana =

- Unincorporated community
- Vigo County's location in Indiana

- location in Vigo County, Indiana
- Coordinates: 39°24′11″N 87°24′06″W
- Country: United States
- State: Indiana
- County: Vigo
- Township: Honey Creek
- Elevation: 495 ft (151 m)
- Time zone: UTC-5 (Eastern (EST))
  - Summer (DST): UTC-4 (EDT)
- ZIP code: 47802
- Area codes: 812, 930
- GNIS feature ID: 443897

Southwood is an unincorporated community in Honey Creek Township, Vigo County, Indiana, United States.

It is part of the Terre Haute metropolitan area.

== Geography ==
Southwood is located at 39°24′11″N 87°24′06″W at an elevation of 495 feet.
