= Shelburn, Indiana =

- Town
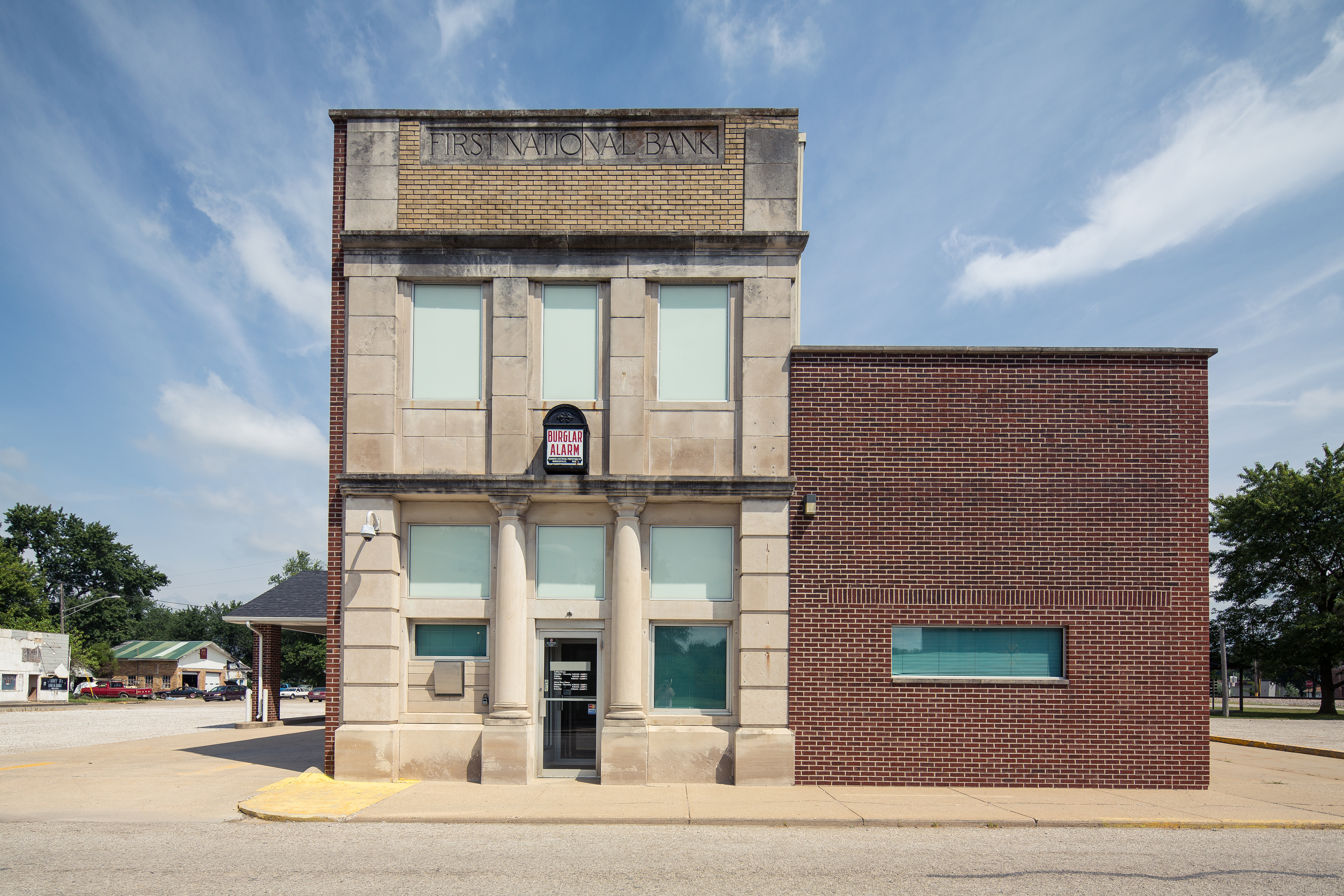

- Location of Shelburn in Sullivan County, Indiana.
- Coordinates: 39°10′46″N 87°23′49″W
- Country: United States
- State: Indiana
- County: Sullivan
- Township: Curry

Area
  - Total: 0.69 sq mi (1.79 km^{2})
  - Land: 0.69 sq mi (1.79 km^{2})
  - Water: 0 sq mi (0.00 km^{2})
- Elevation: 541 ft (165 m)

Population (2020)
  - Total: 1,107
  - Density: 1,603.1/sq mi (618.96/km^{2})
- Time zone: UTC-5 (Eastern (EST))
  - Summer (DST): UTC-4 (EDT)
- ZIP code: 47879
- Area code: 812
- FIPS code: 18-69192
- GNIS feature ID: 443342
- Website: shelburn.in.gov

Shelburn is a town in Curry Township, Sullivan County, in the U.S. state of Indiana. As of the 2020 census, Shelburn had a population of 1,107. It is part of the Terre Haute Metropolitan Statistical Area.

== History ==
Shelburn was named after the town's founder, Paschal Shelburn. The Shelburn post office has been in operation since 1861. An F4 tornado devastated the northwestern part of Shelburn on May 21, 1949, killing 14 people and destroying 160 homes.

== Geography ==
Shelburn is located at 39°10′46″N 87°23′49″W (39.179506, -87.396900).

According to the 2010 census, Shelburn has a total area of 0.69 square miles (1.79 km^{2}), all land.

== Demographics ==
Historical population
Census	Pop.	Note	%±
1880	387		—
1890	378		−2.3%
1900	523		38.4%
1910	2,055		292.9%
1920	1,814		−11.7%
1930	1,548		−14.7%
1940	1,606		3.7%
1950	1,412		−12.1%
1960	1,299		−8.0%
1970	1,281		−1.4%
1980	1,259		−1.7%
1990	1,147		−8.9%
2000	1,268		10.5%
2010	1,252		−1.3%
2020	1,107		−11.6%
U.S. Decennial Census

=== 2020 census ===
As of the 2020 census, Shelburn had a population of 1,107. The median age was 38.7 years. 22.9% of residents were under the age of 18 and 17.6% of residents were 65 years of age or older. For every 100 females there were 97.3 males, and for every 100 females age 18 and over there were 99.8 males age 18 and over.

0.0% of residents lived in urban areas, while 100.0% lived in rural areas.

There were 460 households in Shelburn, of which 31.3% had children under the age of 18 living in them. Of all households, 41.7% were married-couple households, 22.4% were households with a male householder and no spouse or partner present, and 26.7% were households with a female householder and no spouse or partner present. About 30.8% of all households were made up of individuals and 13.0% had someone living alone who was 65 years of age or older.

There were 525 housing units, of which 12.4% were vacant. The homeowner vacancy rate was 1.9% and the rental vacancy rate was 8.8%.

Racial composition as of the 2020 census
Race	Number	Percent
White	1,067	96.4%
Black or African American	1	0.1%
American Indian and Alaska Native	0	0.0%
Asian	0	0.0%
Native Hawaiian and Other Pacific Islander	1	0.1%
Some other race	2	0.2%
Two or more races	36	3.3%
Hispanic or Latino (of any race)	12	1.1%

=== 2010 census ===
As of the census of 2010, there were 1,252 people, 485 households, and 334 families living in the town. The population density was 1,814.5 inhabitants per square mile (700.6/km^{2}). There were 556 housing units at an average density of 805.8 per square mile (311.1/km^{2}). The racial makeup of the town was 96.2% White, 0.5% Native American, 0.6% Asian, 0.6% from other races, and 2.2% from two or more races. Hispanic or Latino of any race were 1.2% of the population.

There were 485 households, of which 36.3% had children under the age of 18 living with them, 44.1% were married couples living together, 16.5% had a female householder with no husband present, 8.2% had a male householder with no wife present, and 31.1% were non-families. 23.7% of all households were made up of individuals, and 8.6% had someone living alone who was 65 years of age or older. The average household size was 2.58 and the average family size was 3.00.

The median age in the town was 37.1 years. 26.8% of residents were under the age of 18; 8.3% were between the ages of 18 and 24; 26% were from 25 to 44; 26.5% were from 45 to 64; and 12.5% were 65 years of age or older. The gender makeup of the town was 48.5% male and 51.5% female.

=== 2000 census ===
As of the census of 2000, there were 1,268 people, 510 households, and 350 families living in the town. The population density was 1,926.0 inhabitants per square mile (743.6/km^{2}). There were 585 housing units at an average density of 888.6 per square mile (343.1/km^{2}). The racial makeup of the town was 97.79% White, 0.24% African American, 0.08% Native American, 0.16% Asian, 0.39% from other races, and 1.34% from two or more races. Hispanic or Latino of any race were 0.55% of the population.

There were 510 households, out of which 33.3% had children under the age of 18 living with them, 48.0% were married couples living together, 14.7% had a female householder with no husband present, and 31.2% were non-families. 27.8% of all households were made up of individuals, and 11.4% had someone living alone who was 65 years of age or older. The average household size was 2.47 and the average family size was 2.96.

In the town, the population was spread out, with 27.6% under the age of 18, 9.1% from 18 to 24, 26.7% from 25 to 44, 23.9% from 45 to 64, and 12.8% who were 65 years of age or older. The median age was 34 years. For every 100 females, there were 94.2 males. For every 100 females age 18 and over, there were 91.3 males.

The median income for a household in the town was $25,714, and the median income for a family was $30,294. Males had a median income of $26,467 versus $20,521 for females. The per capita income for the town was $12,752. About 17.0% of families and 18.0% of the population were below the poverty line, including 24.5% of those under age 18 and 12.7% of those age 65 or over.

== Education ==
Shelburn has a public library, a branch of the Sullivan County Public Library.

== Interurban Depot ==
Shelburn is home to the Shelburn THI&E (Terre Haute, Indianapolis and Eastern Traction Company) Interurban Depot/Substation. The Depot was constructed in two phases between June 1910 and February 1921. The building was listed in the National Register of Historic Places in 2015 under Criterion A, with significant in the area of Transportation for its association with the development of interurban electric light rail transportation in Indiana during the early twentieth century and under Criterion C for its distinctive design and construction associated with the evolution of the interurban electrical light rail system.

An extensive exterior stabilization and restoration project was completed on the building in 2017, which reconstructed the building's roof, replaced doors and windows, and restored the brick masonry.

== Notable people ==
- Walter Bullock, screenwriter and songwriter
- Hosea Siner, baseball player for the National League team Boston Doves in 1909
