= Baldrige =

Baldrige is a surname. Notable people with the surname include:

- Howard Malcolm Baldrige (1894–1985), U. S. Representative from Nebraska.
- Malcolm Baldrige Jr. (1922–1987), commonly referred to as Malcolm Baldrige or "Mac" Baldrige; United States Secretary of Commerce. Son of H. Malcolm Baldrige, and eponym for the Malcolm Baldrige National Quality Award.
- Letitia Baldrige (1926–2012), etiquette expert and public relations executive. Daughter of H. Malcolm Baldrige
- Thomas J. Baldrige (1872–1964), Pennsylvania Attorney General and President Judge of the Superior Court, uncle of Howard M. Baldrige

== See also ==
- Malcolm Baldrige National Quality Award
- Baldridge
