= Prairie Creek, Indiana =

- Unincorporated community
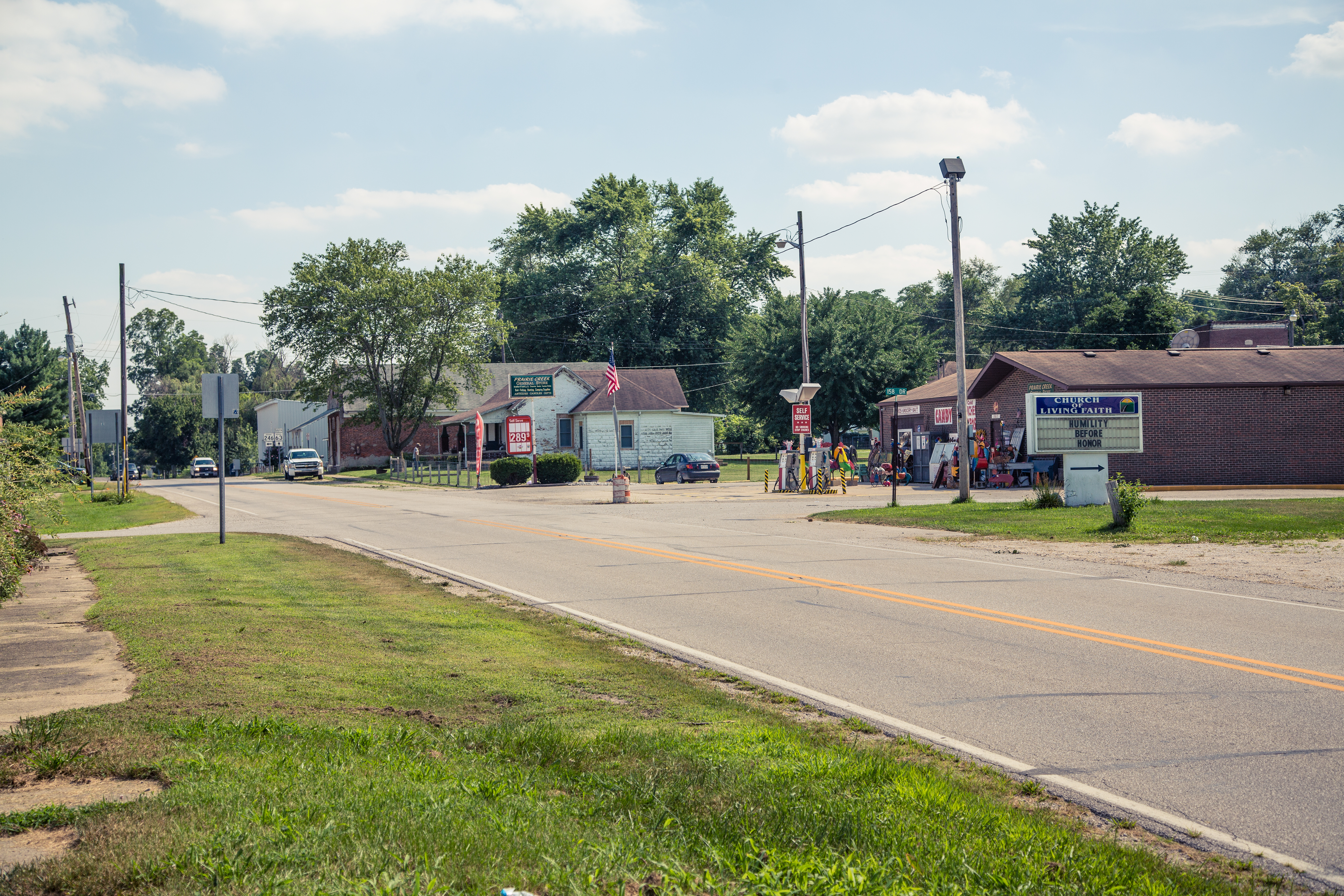
- Street scene in Prairie Creek

- Vigo County's location in Indiana

- Prairie Creek's location in Vigo County, Indiana
- Coordinates: 39°16′26″N 87°29′58″W
- Country: United States
- State: Indiana
- County: Vigo
- Township: Prairie Creek
- Elevation: 532 ft (162 m)
- Time zone: UTC-5 (Eastern (EST))
  - Summer (DST): UTC-4 (EDT)
- ZIP code: 47869
- Area codes: 812, 930
- GNIS feature ID: 2830568

Prairie Creek (also Middletown) is an unincorporated community in southeastern Prairie Creek Township, Vigo County, in the U.S. state of Indiana. Although Prairie Creek is unincorporated, it has a post office, with the ZIP code of 47869.

The community is part of the Terre Haute Metropolitan Statistical Area.

== History ==
The town of Middletown was laid out August 24, 1831, by James D. Piety on the old Vincennes Road. Early businesses included Daniel Ryerson's hotel and drug store, Jonas P. Lykins's store, Z. J. Hunt's hotel, and Hiram Hight's steam mill in 1847. Jacob Ernest built the first brick house, in 1849.

The post office at Prairie Creek has been in operation since 1822.

== Geography ==
Prairie Creek lies at the intersection of State Roads 63 and 246 southwest of the city of Terre Haute, the county seat of Vigo County.

== Demographics ==
The United States Census Bureau defined Prairie Creek as a census designated place in the 2022 American Community Survey.
