= Keller, Indiana =

- Unincorporated community
- Vigo County's location in Indiana

- location in Vigo County, Indiana
- Coordinates: 39°21′37″N 87°19′27″W
- Country: United States
- State: Indiana
- County: Vigo
- Township: Riley
- Elevation: 571 ft (174 m)
- Time zone: UTC-5 (Eastern (EST))
  - Summer (DST): UTC-4 (EDT)
- ZIP code: 47802
- Area codes: 812, 930
- GNIS feature ID: 437204

Keller is an unincorporated community in Riley Township, Vigo County, in the U.S. state of Indiana. It is part of the Terre Haute metropolitan area. Part of the old general store is still standing, but all other businesses have been torn down. Keller is exclusively a residential community today.

== History ==
Keller was known as Ferrell until 1903. A post office was established under this name in 1903, was renamed to Keller that same year, and was discontinued in 1913.

== Geography ==
Keller is located at 39°21′37″N 87°19′27″W at an elevation of 571 feet.
