= Woodgate, Indiana =

- Unincorporated community
- Vigo County's location in Indiana

- location in Vigo County, Indiana
- Coordinates: 39°23′05″N 87°23′07″W
- Country: United States
- State: Indiana
- County: Vigo
- Township: Honey Creek
- Elevation: 561 ft (171 m)
- Time zone: UTC-5 (Eastern (EST))
  - Summer (DST): UTC-4 (EDT)
- ZIP code: 47802
- Area codes: 812, 930
- GNIS feature ID: 446284

Woodgate is an unincorporated community in central Honey Creek Township, Vigo County, in the U.S. state of Indiana.

It is part of the Terre Haute metropolitan area.

== Geography ==
Woodgate is located at 39°23′05″N 87°23′07″W at an elevation of 561 feet.
