= Lewis, Indiana =

- Unincorporated community
- Lewis, as seen in a map of Vigo County
- Coordinates: 39°15′33″N 87°15′08″W
- Country: United States
- State: Indiana
- County: Vigo, Sullivan
- Township: Pierson, Jackson
- Platted: 9 September 1838
- Elevation: 597 ft (182 m)
- Time zone: UTC-5 (Eastern)
  - Summer (DST): UTC-4 (EDT)
- ZIP code: 47858
- Area codes: 812, 930
- FIPS code: 18-43020
- GNIS feature ID: 2830567

Lewis, also known as Lewisburg or Centerville, is an unincorporated community and census designated place (CDP) in Vigo County, in the U.S. state of Indiana. Originally platted entirely within Vigo County, it has now expanded into adjacent Sullivan County.

It is part of the Terre Haute Metropolitan Statistical Area.

== History ==
The town was laid out September 9, 1838, by Addison Williams near the south line of Vigo County, on the Centerville wagon road, which was used by the pony express for a few years. The first business in town was a tannery established by Joseph Stutman, and the first house was built by Charles Stewart in 1842. A cabinet shop run by the Buskirks and John B. Smith's blacksmith shop soon followed. Dodson & Jenkins opened a store in 1844. Lewis had a log school-house for many years, and established itself as a canal town as well.

The post office at Lewis has been in operation since 1840.

== Demographics ==
The United States Census Bureau delineated Lewis as a census designated place in the 2022 American Community Survey.
