= Riley Township, Vigo County, Indiana =

Riley Township
- Township
- Location in Vigo County
- Coordinates: 39°23′22″N 87°17′45″W
- Country: United States
- State: Indiana
- County: Vigo

Government
  - Type: Indiana township

Area
  - Total: 35.86 sq mi (92.9 km^{2})
  - Land: 35.23 sq mi (91.2 km^{2})
  - Water: 0.63 sq mi (1.6 km^{2}) 1.76%
- Elevation: 548 ft (167 m)

Population (2020)
  - Total: 3,153
  - Density: 88.6/sq mi (34.2/km^{2})
- Time zone: UTC-5 (Eastern (EST))
  - Summer (DST): UTC-4 (EDT)
- ZIP codes: 47802, 47803
- GNIS feature ID: 453802

Riley Township is one of twelve townships in Vigo County, Indiana, United States. As of the 2010 census, its population was 3,123 and it contained 1,260 housing units.

== Geography ==
According to the 2010 census, the township has a total area of 35.86 square miles (92.9 km^{2}), of which 35.23 square miles (91.2 km^{2}) (or 98.24%) is land and 0.63 square miles (1.6 km^{2}) (or 1.76%) is water.

=== Cities, towns, villages ===
- Riley
- Terre Haute (southeast edge)

=== Unincorporated communities ===
- Keller

=== Adjacent townships ===
- Lost Creek Township (north)
- Posey Township, Clay County (northeast)
- Perry Township, Clay County (east)
- Pierson Township (south)
- Linton Township (southwest)
- Honey Creek Township (west)
- Harrison Township (northwest)

=== Cemeteries ===
The township contains six cemeteries: Cooper, Jones, Liberty, Mewhinney, Miner, and Oak Hill.

=== Lakes ===
- Lee Lake
- Wonder Lake

== School districts ==
- Vigo County School Corporation

== Political districts ==
- Indiana's 8th congressional district
- State House District 46
- State Senate District 39
