= Honey Creek Township, Vigo County, Indiana =

Honey Creek Township
- Township
- Location in Vigo County
- Coordinates: 39°23′36″N 87°24′25″W
- Country: United States
- State: Indiana
- County: Vigo

Government
  - Type: Indiana township

Area
  - Total: 34.08 sq mi (88.3 km^{2})
  - Land: 33.71 sq mi (87.3 km^{2})
  - Water: 0.37 sq mi (0.96 km^{2}) 1.09%
- Elevation: 490 ft (150 m)

Population (2020)
  - Total: 17,400
  - Density: 509.6/sq mi (196.8/km^{2})
- Time zone: UTC-5 (Eastern (EST))
  - Summer (DST): UTC-4 (EDT)
- ZIP codes: 47802, 47803
- GNIS feature ID: 453417

Honey Creek Township is one of twelve townships in Vigo County, Indiana, United States. As of the 2010 census, its population was 17,179 and it contained 6,509 housing units. It contains Terre Haute's main shopping district along U.S. Route 41 and is by far the most characteristically suburban of the twelve Vigo County townships. The population includes inmates from the Terre Haute Federal Penitentiary, located at its northwest corner.

== Geography ==
According to the 2010 census, the township has a total area of 34.08 square miles (88.3 km^{2}), of which 33.71 square miles (87.3 km^{2}) (or 98.91%) is land and 0.37 square miles (0.96 km^{2}) (or 1.09%) is water.

=== Cities, towns, villages ===
- Terre Haute (southwest edge)

=== Unincorporated communities ===
- Allendale
- Southwood
- Spring Hill
- Woodgate
- Youngstown

=== Adjacent townships ===
- Harrison Township (north)
- Lost Creek Township (northeast)
- Riley Township (east)
- Pierson Township (southeast)
- Linton Township (south)
- Prairieton Township (west)
- Sugar Creek Township (northwest)

=== Cemeteries ===
The township contains these three cemeteries: Durham, Hull and Smith.

=== Landmarks ===
- Federal Bureau of Prisons Terre Haute Penitentiary (vast majority)

== Demographics ==
As of the census of 2000, there were 14,280 people and 5,794 households residing in the township. The population density was 423/mi^{2}. The racial makeup of the township was 86.4% White, 8.1% Black or African American, 0.3% Native American, 3.5% Asian, less than 0.1% Pacific Islander, 0.5% from other races, and 1.1% from two or more races. 2.4% of the population were Hispanic or Latino of any race.

The average household size was 2.31 and the average family size was 2.91. The median age was 31.6 years. For every 100 females, there were 118 males.

The median income for a household in the township was $42,065, and the median income for a family was $54,753. The per capita income for the township was $22,634. 6.4% of the population and 3.9% of families were below the poverty line.

== School districts ==
- Vigo County School Corporation

== Political districts ==
- Indiana's 8th congressional district
- State House District 46
- State Senate District 39
