= Frank Senour Round Barn =

- U.S. National Register of Historic Places
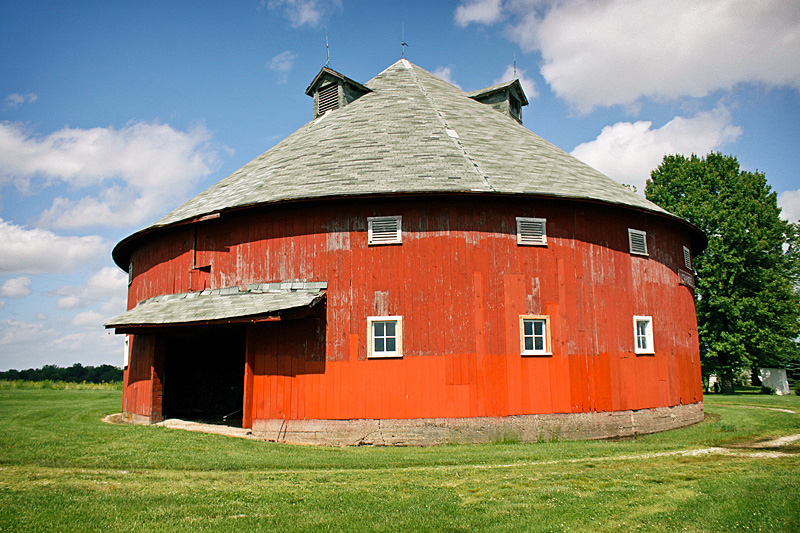

- Location within Indiana
- Location: 6400 East Oregon Church Road, Blackhawk, Indiana; United States
- Coordinates: 39°20′7″N 87°19′10″W
- Built: 1905
- MPS: Round and Polygonal Barns of Indiana
- NRHP reference No.: 93000193
- Added to NRHP: April 2, 1993

The Frank Senour Round Barn, also known as the Crandell Barn, is a round barn in the vicinity of Blackhawk, Indiana, about 13 miles south of Terre Haute.

For its agricultural and architectural significance, the barn was placed on the National Register of Historic Places in 1993 as part of a Round and Polygonal Barns of Indiana Multiple Listing.

== History ==
The barn was built in 1905 by Frank Senour, who was impressed with the efficiency of similar barns in nearby Illinois. In 1922 a tornado damaged the barn's original cupola; the roof was patched but the cupola was not rebuilt.

Since 1972 the barn has been owned and maintained by the Crandell family.

== Structure ==
The barn is a true circular barn with no angles in its circumference. It has red vertical siding and a conical roof with four small dormers. It was built in 1905 during a time when round barns were promoted as models of efficiency, since the circular shape has a greater volume-to-surface ratio than a square shaped barn. Farmers could also work in a continuous direction, saving time and labor.
