= Linton Township, Vigo County, Indiana =

Linton Township
- Township
- Location in Vigo County
- Coordinates: 39°18′23″N 87°24′43″W
- Country: United States
- State: Indiana
- County: Vigo

Government
  - Type: Indiana township

Area
  - Total: 35.43 sq mi (91.8 km^{2})
  - Land: 34.97 sq mi (90.6 km^{2})
  - Water: 0.46 sq mi (1.2 km^{2}) 1.30%
- Elevation: 574 ft (175 m)

Population (2020)
  - Total: 1,256
  - Density: 37.8/sq mi (14.6/km^{2})
- Time zone: UTC-5 (Eastern (EST))
  - Summer (DST): UTC-4 (EDT)
- ZIP codes: 47802, 47850, 47866
- GNIS feature ID: 453575

Linton Township is one of twelve townships in Vigo County, Indiana, United States. As of the 2010 census, its population was 1,323 and it contained 555 housing units.

== History ==
Linton Township High School and Community Building was listed on the National Register of Historic Places in 2002.

== Geography ==
According to the 2010 census, the township has a total area of 35.43 square miles (91.8 km^{2}), of which 34.97 square miles (90.6 km^{2}) (or 98.70%) is land and 0.46 square miles (1.2 km^{2}) (or 1.30%) is water.

=== Unincorporated communities ===
- Pimento

=== Adjacent townships ===
- Honey Creek Township (north)
- Riley Township (northeast)
- Pierson Township (east)
- Jackson Township, Sullivan County (southeast)
- Curry Township, Sullivan County (south)
- Fairbanks Township, Sullivan County (southwest)
- Prairie Creek Township (west)
- Prairieton Township (northwest)

=== Cemeteries ===
The township contains three cemeteries: Kester Family Cemetery, Brown, and Union.

=== Airports and landing strips ===
- Kester Fly Inn Airport

=== Lakes ===
- Fowler Lake

== School districts ==
- Vigo County School Corporation

== Political districts ==
- Indiana's 8th congressional district
- State House District 46
- State Senate District 39
