= Baldridge, Indiana =

- Unincorporated community
- Sullivan County's location in Indiana

- Location in Sullivan County, Indiana
- Coordinates: 39°13′22″N 87°22′13″W
- Country: United States
- State: Indiana
- County: Sullivan
- Township: Curry
- Elevation: 590 ft (180 m)
- Time zone: UTC-5 (Eastern (EST))
  - Summer (DST): UTC-4 (EDT)
- ZIP code: 47850
- Area codes: 812, 930
- GNIS feature ID: 430450

Baldridge is an unincorporated community in Curry Township, Sullivan County, in the U.S. state of Indiana.

The community is part of the Terre Haute Metropolitan Statistical Area.

== History ==
Baldridge likely takes its name from a nearby coal mine.

== Geography ==
Baldridge is located at 39°13′22″N 87°22′13″W.
