= Linton Township High School and Community Building =

- U.S. National Register of Historic Places
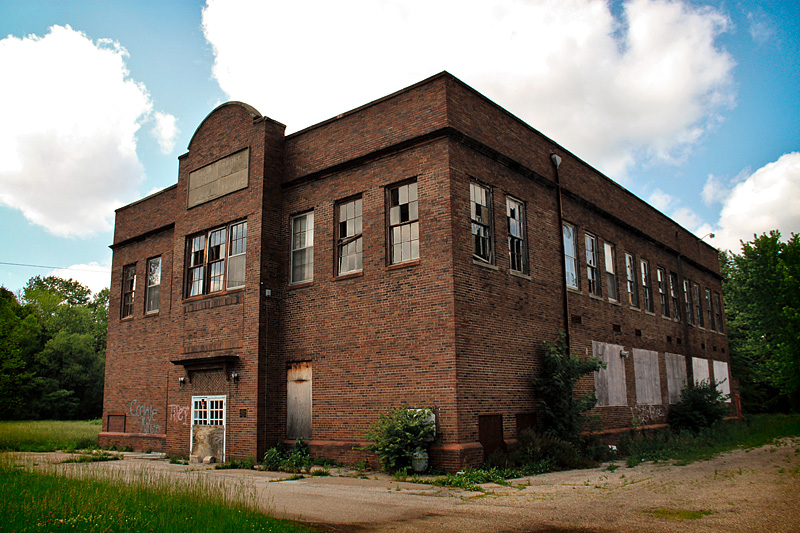

- Location within Vigo County, Indiana Location within Indiana Location within the United States
- Location: 13041 Pimento Circle, Pimento, Indiana; United States
- Coordinates: 39°18′30″N 87°23′6″W
- Architect: Albert G. Beldon Co.
- Architectural style: American Craftsman
- MPS: Indiana's Public Common and High Schools MPS
- NRHP reference No.: 02000200
- Added to NRHP: March 20, 2002

Linton Township High School and Community Building or Pimento School is a historic school and community center building located at Pimento, Indiana. It was built by architects from the Albert G. Beldon company in 1925. It is in the American Craftsman style of architecture. The contractor was James O. Sickels of Princeton, Indiana. The building is now abandoned in disrepair.

The school was placed on the National Register of Historic Places in 2002.
