= Riley, Indiana =

- Town
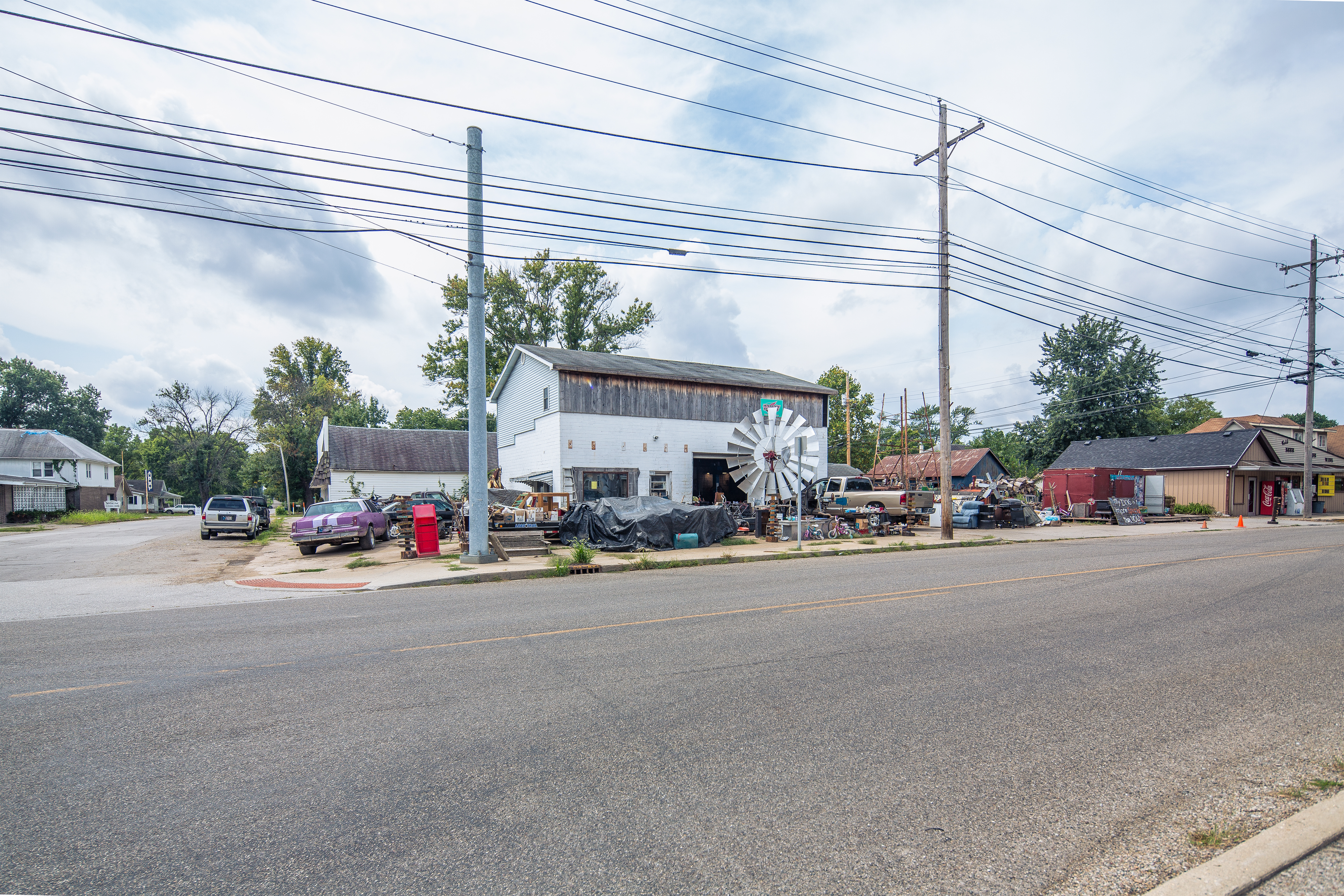
- Entering Riley

- Location of Riley in Vigo County, Indiana.
- Coordinates: 39°23′23″N 87°18′01″W
- Country: United States
- State: Indiana
- County: Vigo
- Township: Riley

Area
  - Total: 0.089 sq mi (0.23 km^{2})
  - Land: 0.089 sq mi (0.23 km^{2})
  - Water: 0 sq mi (0.00 km^{2})
- Elevation: 568 ft (173 m)

Population (2020)
  - Total: 238
  - Density: 2,655.6/sq mi (1,025.32/km^{2})
- Time zone: UTC-5 (Eastern (EST))
  - Summer (DST): UTC-4 (EDT)
- ZIP code: 47871
- Area code: 812
- FIPS code: 18-64512
- GNIS feature ID: 2396879

Riley, once known as Lockport, is a town in Riley Township, Vigo County, in the U.S. state of Indiana. As of the 2020 census, Riley had a population of 238. It is part of the Terre Haute Metropolitan Statistical Area.

== History ==
The original town of Lockport was platted on November 23, 1836, by Nathaniel Donham. It was known as Lockport due to its importance during the building of the Wabash and Erie Canal from 1847–1850. The canal town became a significant trading point along the waterway. Though the canal closed in 1873, the building of several different railroads kept the community as a place for trade. The town originally had various mills, sawmills and tanneries, but all were burned at different times. It was also notable in the grain market.

In 1911, the town took the name of its post office and became Riley. For several decades, Riley sustained a healthy coal mining industry including a strip mine just south of town, operated by the Maumee Colleries Company as late as 1936. In the second half of the twentieth century, Riley included a small suburban residential community.

== Geography ==
Riley is located at 39°23′23″N 87°18′2″W (39.389838, -87.300420).

At one time, the Wabash and Erie Canal ran through Riley and there are remnants of locks and the canal in several places.

According to the 2010 census, Riley has a total area of 0.09 square miles (0.23 km^{2}), all land.

== Demographics ==
Historical population
Census	Pop.	Note	%±
1930	260		—
1940	287		10.4%
1950	251		−12.5%
1960	248		−1.2%
1970	257		3.6%
1980	269		4.7%
1990	232		−13.8%
2000	160		−31.0%
2010	221		38.1%
2020	238		7.7%
U.S. Decennial Census

=== 2020 census ===
At the 2020 census, there were 221 people, 93 households and 57 families living in the town. The population density was 2,455.6 inhabitants per square mile (948.1/km^{2}). There were 103 housing units at an average density of 1,144.4 per square mile (441.9/km^{2}). The racial make-up of the town was 100% White, 0% Minorities

There were 93 households, of which 33.3% had children under the age of 18 living with them, 44.1% were married couples living together, 14.0% had a female householder with no husband present, 3.2% had a male householder with no wife present, and 38.7% were non-families. 35.5% of all households were made up of individuals, and 13% had someone living alone who was 65 years of age or older. The average household size was 2.38 and the average family size was 3.07.

The median age in the town was 32.8 years. 27.1% of residents were under the age of 18; 10.4% were between the ages of 18 and 24; 29.4% were from 25 to 44; 18.1% were from 45 to 64; and 14.9% were 65 years of age or older. The sex make-up of the town was 50.7% male and 49.3% female.

=== 2000 census ===
At the 2000 census, there were 160 people, 76 households and 44 families living in the town. The population density was 1,747.7 inhabitants per square mile (674.8/km^{2}). There were 83 housing units at an average density of 906.6 per square mile (350.0/km^{2}). The racial make-up of the town was 100% White, and 0% Minorities

There were 76 households, of which 21.1% had children under the age of 18 living with them, 50.0% were married couples living together, 6.6% had a female householder with no husband present, and 40.8% were non-families. 36.8% of all households were made up of individuals, and 22.4% had someone living alone who was 65 years of age or older. The average household size was 2.11 and the average family size was 2.76.

21.9% of the population were under the age of 18, 6.3% from 18 to 24, 23.8% from 25 to 44, 21.3% from 45 to 64, and 26.9% who were 65 years of age or older. The median age was 38 years. For every 100 females, there were 83.9 males. For every 100 females age 18 and over, there were 81.2 males.

The median household income was $28,333 and the median family income was $35,833. Males had a median income of $31,667 and females $23,750. The per capita income for the town was $13,616. About 15.0% of families and 12.0% of the population were below the poverty line, including 13.9% of those under the age of eighteen and 22.2% of those 65 or over.

== Education ==
All areas in Vigo County are in the Vigo County School Corporation. Riley is zoned to Riley Elementary School, Honey Creek Middle School and Terre Haute South Vigo High School.
