= List of public art in Terre Haute, Indiana =

This is a list of public art in Terre Haute, Indiana, and the surrounding area of Vigo County, Indiana.

This list applies only to works of public art accessible in an outdoor public space. For example, this does not include artwork visible inside a museum.

Most of the works mentioned are sculptures. When this is not the case (i.e. sound installation, for example) it is stated next to the title.

== Terre Haute ==
Title	Artist	Year	Location/GPS Coordinates	Material	Dimensions	Owner	Image
Composite House for Terre Haute	Lauren Ewing	2007	Along U.S. Route 40 in Gilbert Park at 14 1/2 Street and Wabash Ave.	Indiana Oolitic limestone	4 feet high, 5 feet wide, 7 feet deep	Wabash Valley Art Spaces	
Emanating Connections	Chakaia Booker	2009	Campus of Indiana State University near the New Theater, 540 North 7th St.	Bias-ply tire and Stainless steel	6'2" high, 2'8" wide, 2'8" deep		
Flame of the Millennium	Leonardo Nierman	2002–2003	Campus of Rose-Hulman Institute of Technology	Stainless steel	45 feet high	Rose-Hulman Institute of Technology	
Gatekeeper	Sally Rogers	2008	Vigo County Public Library 39°27′47.7″N 87°24′30.6″W	Stainless steel and Dakota Mahogany Granite	13'9" high, 24'6" wide, 6' deep		
Max Ehrmann at the Crossroads	Bill Wolfe	2010	7th St. and Wabash Ave. 39°28′0.05″N 87°24′26.1″W	Bronze			
Runner	Douglas Kornfeld	2009	Campus of Indiana State University at the Student Recreation Center, 601 North 6th St.	Stainless steel	23' high, 18' wide, 6' deep		
Spirit of Space	Bob Emser	2007	Outside Swope Art Museum 39°27′56.52″N 87°24′26.28″W	Steel and aluminum	7.5 feet high, 7 feet wide, 2.5 feet deep		
Tree	Mark Wallis	2007	Along U.S. Route 40 at Memorial Stadium Grounds	Steel	16 feet high, 45 feet wide, 12 feet deep		
