= Wabash Valley Art Spaces =

- Legal status: Not for profit
- Purpose: Promotion of public art
- Location(s): Terre Haute, Indiana United States
- Executive Director: Mary Kramer
- Website: WabashValleyArtSpaces.com

Wabash Valley Art Spaces, incorporated as Art Spaces, Inc. — Wabash Valley Outdoor Sculpture Collection, is a non-profit arts organization based in Terre Haute, Indiana and serving the Wabash Valley region. It sponsors the creation and installation of site-specific outdoor sculpture. Art Spaces also has sponsored public events including the Max Ehrmann Poetry Competition, which corresponded with the installation of Max Ehrmann at the Crossroads in 2010.

== Philosophy ==
The Art Spaces mission statement states the organization exists "to establish a collection of public outdoor sculpture" in the area it serves.

== Collection ==
Works are located throughout the Wabash Valley area and include:

- Flame of the Millennium by Leonardo Nierman (located at Rose-Hulman Institute of Technology)
- TREE by Mark Wallis
- Composite House for Terre Haute by Lauren Ewing
- Spirit of Space by Bob Emser
- Gatekeeper by Sally Rogers (located at the Vigo County Public Library)
- Emanating Connections by Chakaia Booker (located on the campus of Indiana State University)
- Runner by Doug Kornfeld (located on the campus of Indiana State University)
- Max Ehrmann at the Crossroads by Bill Wolfe

== See also ==
- List of public art in Terre Haute, Indiana
