= Jane Street =

Jane Street may refer to:

- Jane Street (labor organizer) (1887–1966), American union founder
- Jane Street Capital, an American quantitative trading firm in New York City
- Jane Street (Toronto), major road in Canada
- Jane Street Theatre, now the Jane, on Jane Street, West Village, Manhattan, New York City, U.S.
