= Ángeles testigos de la Beatificación de Juan de Palafox y Mendoza =

Sculpture in Puebla, Mexico

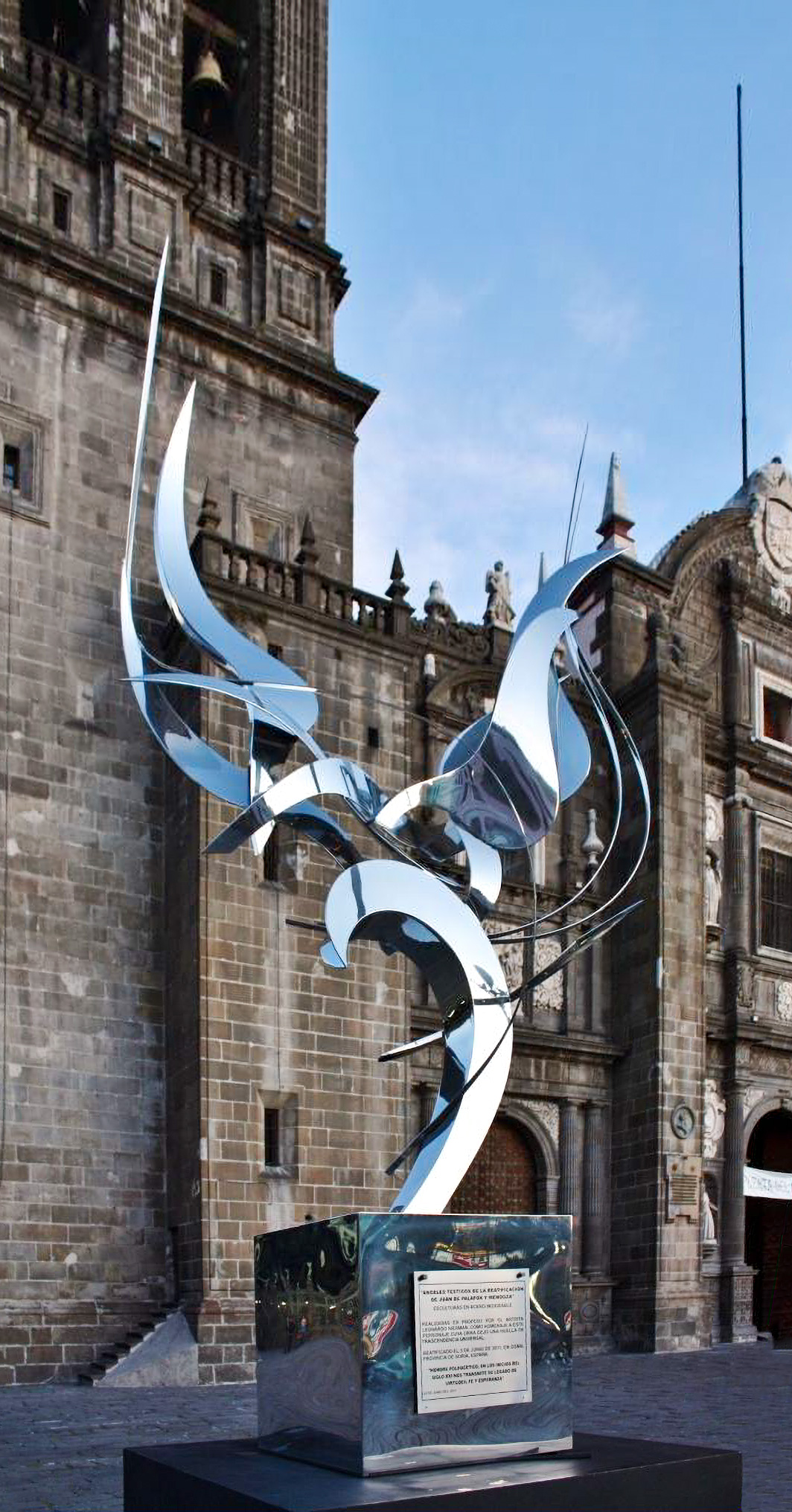
- The sculpture in 2011
- Artist: Leonardo Nierman
- Location: Puebla, Puebla, Mexico
- 19°2′36.1″N 98°11′56.1″W

Ángeles testigos de la Beatificación de Juan de Palafox y Mendoza (Spanish for "Angels witnesses of the Beatification of Juan de Palafox y Mendoza") is a sculpture by Leonardo Nierman, installed outside the Cathedral of Puebla in Puebla's historic centre, in the Mexican state of Puebla.
