= Composite House for Terre Haute =

Public artwork

- Artist: Lauren Ewing
- Year: 2007
- Medium: Indiana limestone
- Dimensions: 120 cm × 150 cm × 210 cm (4 ft × 5 ft × 7 ft)
- Location: Terre Haute, Indiana, United States; 39°28′06″N 87°23′37″W
- Owner: Wabash Valley Art Spaces

Composite House for Terre Haute is a public artwork by American artist Lauren Ewing, located in Gilbert Park at 14 1/2 Street and Wabash Ave. (U.S. Route 40) in Terre Haute, Indiana, United States. It is part of the Wabash Valley Art Spaces Outdoor Sculpture Collection.

== Description ==
The work depicts a composite cottage house shape utilized in many Terre Haute homes, particularly in the late 19th and early 20th centuries. It is made of Indiana Oolitic limestone and stands at 4 feet tall. The sculpture sits on a stone base.

== Acquisition ==
The sculpture was dedicated on November 5, 2007, in Gilbert Park. Speakers included representatives from Art Spaces, Inc., Arts Illiana, the Indiana Arts Commission and the Wabash Valley Community Foundation. Ewing was present for the official dedication.
