= Terre Haute City Council =

Legislative body of the City of Terre Haute, Indiana

Type
- Type: Unicameral
- Term limits: none

Leadership
- Council President: Anthony Dinkel (D)
- Council Vice President: Amanda Thompson (D)

Structure
- Seats: 9
- Political groups: Democratic (9)

Elections
- Last election: November 7, 2023

Website
- https://www.terrehaute.in.gov/departments/city-council/

The Terre Haute City Council the legislative branch of government for the city of Terre Haute, Indiana. The council uses a strong mayor system with a separately elected mayor who acts as the executive. There are currently nine members of the council. City council members serve a four-year term and there is no term limit. The council consists of nine members, of which 3 are at-large and 6 are representing districts.

== Current composition ==
This is the current composition of the council. The president is Anthony Dinkel and the vice president is Amanda Thompson.

District	Name	Party	Notes
At-large	George Azar	Democratic	
At-large	Tammy Boland	Democratic	
At-large	Curtis DeBaun IV	Democratic	
1	Kandace G. Hinton	Democratic	
2	Amanda Thompson	Democratic	Vice President
3	Cheryl Loudermilk	Democratic	
4	Todd Nation	Democratic	
5	James P. Chalos	Democratic	
6	Anthony J. Dinkel	Democratic	President
