= Lauren Ewing =

American artist (born 1946)

Lauren Ewing (born 1946) is an American sculptor and installation artist whose work has examined material culture, architecture, memory, and the relationship between objects and their social contexts. Her practice encompasses sculpture, installation, drawing, photography, printmaking, and, more recently, painting. Her work has been exhibited in the United States and internationally, including at the Hirshhorn Museum and Sculpture Garden, the New Museum of Contemporary Art, Storm King Art Center, and MoMA PS1. Her work is held in 37 public collections, including the Museum of Modern Art and the Metropolitan Museum of Art, and over 50 private collections.

== Early life and education ==
Ewing was born in 1946 and grew up in Indiana. She graduated from Skidmore College, with a Bachelor of Arts degree in 1968. From 1969 to 1971 she studied at Indiana State University, where she earned a master's degree, and from 1971 to 1973 she studied at the University of California, Santa Barbara, where she received a Master of Fine Arts degree.

Ewing's early artistic development was connected to her interest in architecture as social and philosophical embodiment, site-specific sculpture, and the relationship between objects and their surroundings. Some of her later work continued to draw on architectural forms and the social meanings attached to familiar structures and cultural objects.

== Career ==
=== Early work ===
Ewing became active in the New York contemporary-art scene during the 1970s. In 1979 she participated in Special Projects (Spring 1979) at MoMA PS1 in Long Island City. The museum's archival records preserve documentation of Ewing's project, including a project description, background material, and video stills.

Her work during the late 1970s and 1980s frequently incorporated architectural forms, industrial imagery, and mechanisms of institutional control. In 1980 she presented A Powerhouse for Adam Smith at the New Museum of Contemporary Art in New York as part of the exhibition Investigations: Probe, Structure, Analysis. The exhibition catalogue contains an essay by Alan Schwartzman and Lynn Gumpert about Ewing’s installation. At the same time Ewing built a simultaneously existing double of the Powerhouse in nature on Bennington College campus in Vermont. Both of these have a single strand of silk thread moving through two faux helical spinning machines inside.

In 1981 Ewing was included in Metaphor: New Projects by Six Contemporary Sculptors at the Hirshhorn Museum and Sculpture Garden in Washington, D.C. The exhibition presented large-scale works by contemporary sculptors that explored metaphor and allegory through quasi-architectural structures, machines, and environments. Ewing contributed The Prison: Auto-Plastique, a large-scale installation demonstrating a lack of reciprocal visibility referencing Jeremy Bentham’s panopticon prison design.

This was the first of three involuntary institutions Ewing built in the early 1980s. The other two were The Asylum: That Which Is Secret Gathers Together (1980), Art on the Beach, landfill that became Battery Park City, NYC; and The School: Susan, Mary, Alice, William, Henry, Walt (1983), Robert Wood Johnson Hospital Atrium, New Brunswick, NJ. Ewing also built three voluntary institutions: The Library, A Device for Storing the Winds of the World Before and After the Famous Random Event (1981), Skidmore College Campus Library, Saratoga Springs, NY; The Powerhouse: A Device for Gaining Heart: A Conspiracy, A Fake, A Rerun and Simulation (1981), Museum of Art, Rhode Island School of Design; The Bank: Opus Proprium (Art Lobby) (1982), Chase Manhattan Bank lobby, NYC.

The six institutions in this series demonstrate and discuss the social construction of reality. Institutions are the physical embodiment of culturally-held beliefs and values. Ewing re-scripts and reimagines them all.

Ewing’s interest in architecture and institutional space continued in The Wilderness Screen (1985), which was later presented in the 1991 Storm King Art Center exhibition Enclosures and Encounters: Architectural Aspects of Recent Sculpture. The exhibition brought together six artists whose works examined architectural forms as artistic structures and metaphors.

In the 1990s, Ewing also had solo exhibitions in Europe including installations at the Kunstverein in Ludwigsburg, Germany; the Kunsthallen Brandts Klaedefabrik in Odense, Denmark; the Kunstforum Bien Rathaus in Hallein, Austria; Galerie Eboran in Salzburg, Austria; and Interim Art in London. She also had an installation in the 1990 Sydney Biennale “The Readymade Boomerang,” curated by Rene Block (Sydney, Australia).

=== Teaching ===
Alongside her studio practice, Ewing pursued an academic career in art and sculpture. She was an Assistant Professor at Williams College 1973-77, where she also served as a guest curator at the Williams College Museum of Art. She taught at the Rhode Island School of Design 1977-78, where she became the first woman to head its sculpture department. She later joined Rutgers University's Mason Gross School of the Arts, where she was a professor in the Department of Visual Arts and taught sculpture and artists' writing 1978-2007. She also served as director of the graduate program at Mason Gross School of the Arts. Rutgers later identified her among its distinguished graduate faculty who had retired after many years of teaching.

Her influence as an educator extended to artists who later became established practitioners. Australian artist Brad Buckley, for example, recalled studying with Ewing at the Rhode Island School of Design and identified her as an important part of the faculty environment during his graduate studies there. As Visiting Critic in Graduate Sculpture at Yale (1988, 1989), she worked with Ann Hamilton, Roni Horn, and Michael Rees, among others.

== Artistic practice ==
Ewing's work has frequently considered the relationship between individuals and institutions and the ways in which objects, architecture, technology, and built environments shape cultural memory. Her work addresses the relationship between the individual and institutions, the interaction of nature and culture, and material culture in relation to memory and desire. Her installations often combine objects, images, figures and electronic texts that are thematically provocative and richly poetic.

A recurring feature of her work has been the transformation of recognizable objects or architectural forms into structures with altered meanings. Her early sculptures drew on industrial and architectural imagery, while later works increasingly incorporated digital processes, text, and references to historical images and objects. Everybody’s Nicholas Brown (1991), a plywood simulation of the most valued piece of American furniture, is now in the collection of the San Diego Contemporary Museum.

Her 2006 work For Magritte exemplifies this approach. The digital print repeats a floating architectural silhouette (The Powerhouse) over an early 19^{th} century photograph of the boulevard ending at the Paris Opera House. The silhouette derives from Ewing's 1981 sculpture The Powerhouse: A Device for Gaining Heart. The title refers to the Belgian Surrealist artist René Magritte. The work is held by the Metropolitan Museum of Art, Princeton University Art Museum, MoMA, and other collections.

=== Public sculpture ===
Ewing has also produced site-specific public sculpture, including A Powerhouse for Adam Smith (Bennington College campus), QUANTA (Baltimore Harbor), The Library (Skidmore College library), Subject/Object Memory (Penrose Plaza, Philadelphia), The Endless Gate (Seattle Center Entrance), and Traveler’s History Arch (Lyons, NJ). In 2007 she created Composite House for Terre Haute, a limestone sculpture installed in Gilbert Park in Terre Haute, Indiana. The work, made of Indiana oolitic limestone, was inspired by the forms of common house types found in Terre Haute's older neighborhoods and in small towns from the Atlantic seaboard to the Mississippi Valley. Ewing’s use of Indiana limestone connects the sculpture's material to the region's architectural and industrial history. It measures approximately four feet high, five feet wide, and seven feet deep.

The sculpture was particularly connected to Ewing's ties to the region. Her family had farmed land in Southern Indiana since the early 19th century, and she later designed a house on the family property as a retreat from New York. The project and her return to Indiana were featured in Dwell magazine in 2010.

=== Provincetown AIDS Memorial ===
One of Ewing's most prominent later public works is the Provincetown AIDS Memorial at Town Hall in Provincetown, Massachusetts. The project originated with a 2013 design competition organized to create a permanent memorial to people affected by the AIDS epidemic in the community. Ewing's proposal was selected, and the memorial was unveiled in 2018.

The memorial consists of two large pieces of carbon-gray quartzite, each weighing approximately eight and a half tons. Their sides are smooth while their upper surfaces are sculpted with undulating forms resembling the surface of the ocean. It is one moment of ocean time that is beautiful, temporal and unique like every individual. The word "Remembering" is carved into two sides, while another side carries an inscription describing the memorial's purpose and Provincetown's response to the AIDS crisis. The opposite side quotes fragments of poems of Provincetown poets. The memorial was commissioned by the Provincetown Cultural Council~~.~~

The memorial has also been the subject of critical discussion. Writing in The New Yorker in 2018, Masha Gessen described Ewing's monument as a tribute to those who died of AIDS but argued that its presentation emphasized remembrance and compassion while leaving out some of the anger, political activism, stigma, and social conflict associated with the epidemic.

== Later work ==
Ewing was invited to participate in the 2017/18 Amsterdam Light Festival where, on a bank of the Herengracht, she built The Big Wave, a 26’ wide x 15’ high blue wave made of electroluminescent ribbon, woven onto a loom-like structure. Ewing believes the Western World is going through a paradigm shift, a wave of the re-examination of the Enlightenment.

In the 2020s Ewing continued to work across sculpture, painting, photography, and digital processes. Her Black Swan paintings, begun in 2020, use carbon-black soot applied with her fingers. The process was developed as a deliberately direct form of mark-making that minimized dependence on technology and emphasized the physical relationship between the artist's hand and the image. The smaller works became studies for the larger series Startling Beauty and Anomie (2022), which were paired with ½ scale cast silver hands.

Her recent works have also continued her engagement with historical and artistic imagery. Who Makes the Image, Who Abides (after Hokusai) and 15th Century Goose in Barbieland (after Sesshu) combine references to Japanese historical imagery with contemporary processes and subjects.

== Exhibitions and collections ==
Ewing's work has been exhibited in museums, galleries, and art institutions in the United States and abroad. Documented venues include MoMA PS1, the New Museum of Contemporary Art, the Hirshhorn Museum and Sculpture Garden, Storm King Art Center, the deCordova Museum, and institutions and galleries in Germany, Austria, Denmark, Britain, Amsterdam, and Australia, including the Sydney Biennale.

Her work is held in the collections of the Museum of Modern Art and the Metropolitan Museum of Art, as well as the National Museum of Women in the Arts, Washington DC, and Princeton University Art Museum. Her public sculptures are installed in several American communities.

== Selected works ==
- A Powerhouse for Adam Smith (1980)
- Auto-Plastique: The Prison (1981)
- The Wilderness Screen (1985)
- Composite House for Terre Haute (2007)
- For Magritte (2006)
- The Big Wave (2017-18)
- Provincetown AIDS Memorial (2018)
- Black Swan series (begun 2020)
- Startling Beauty and Anomie series
- Who Makes the Image, Who Abides (after Hokusai) (2023)
- 15th Century Goose in Barbieland (after Sesshu) (2023)
