= Zhivago Duncan =

Zhivago Duncan is an American contemporary artist of Syrian and Danish descent. currently based in Mexico City. His works ranges from paintings, sculpture and mixed media to substantial installations including complex, mesmeric mechanical fantasies.

== Collections ==
Collections include the Saatchi Gallery, where he has exhibited in the major Gesamtkuntswerk exhibition of new art from Germany. Zhivago has also exhibited in the UK and Germany. On a recent approach to Bruno Brunett, director of leading Berlin gallery Contemporary Fine Arts at an art fair the artist introduced himself with "I’m Zhivago Duncan. Someone told me you’re the only man with the balls to sell my work."

== Gallery ==
According to the Saatchi gallery, one of the world's leading collections of modern art, "through his sprawling, messy multimedia artworks, Zhivago Duncan comments on the state of contemporary culture and its obsessions, crassly quoted and re-created from an irreversibly apocalyptic future point of view.”

Zhivago himself comments: "my work provides a close examination of our society’s excessive infatuation with glamour, fortune, and fame." His work is not one-dimensional, however. According to the Cat Street Gallery, "rather than existing solely as a contemporary commentator, Zhivago also brings an element of historical voyeurism to his pieces, even sometimes nostalgia. Whether expressive silk-screened portraits of celebrities long forgotten or sculptural remnants of abandoned muscle cars, his aesthetic of damage and tarnish pays homage to the countless icons that have been lost in the depths of time."

== Personal ==
Zhivago's multi-faceted character is reflected in his habitation of a variety of creative alter egos who inspire and create his work. One of these was "Nacnud Ogavihz" a reversal of the label of his own identity. In 2010-11 his exhibition Pretentious Crap consisted of paintings and installations created by "Dick Flash". Dick Flash's work is "the result of the imaginary journey of Dick Flash, the world’s sole survivor of the apocalypse according to him and his legacy. Semi-amnesiac, Dick Flash roams the converted world digging up the fruitful remains of his debauched ancestors."
