= Jane Street (labor organizer) =

American labor organizer

- Born: February 20, 1887; Terre Haute, Indiana
- Died: April 25, 1966 (aged 79); Los Angeles, California
- Occupation: Labor activist
- Organization: Domestic Workers Industrial Union of the Industrial Workers of the World

Jane Tuttle Street (February 20, 1887 – April 26, 1966) was an American labor activist, and the founder and secretary of the Industrial Workers of the World (IWW) Local No. 113, the Domestic Workers' Industrial Union, in Denver, Colorado in 1916. Street was known for her techniques for organizing domestic workers who had not been included in early labor laws and who faced many obstacles to organization and vulnerabilities due to their isolation in the homes of individual employers.

== Early life ==
Jane Tuttle was born on February 20, 1887, to Mary Ann and Frank Tuttle, a surveyor, in Terre Haute, Indiana. Tuttle traveled and lived with her older sister, Grace, throughout her life. In 1905 she met John "Jack" Street, who was also known as Herbert Ross Bumpass. The two had a son, Josiah Mars Street, who was born and died on March 1, 1908. On December 21, 1908, Jane and Jack married. They had a second son, Dawn Philander Street, on January 15, 1909.

== Career ==
While living in Sacramento and working as a stenographer, Street's move towards labor activism began as she registered as a member of the Socialist Party in 1914 and joined the Sacramento IWW Mixed Local 71 on February 15, 1915. By 1916 she, along with her son, Dawn, and sister, Grace, had moved to Denver, Colorado. When she arrived, Street began working as a domestic servant and organizing a union. She placed want ads in the paper for maid and cooks. When women would apply, she would collect information and invite them to meetings. On March 19, 1916, the Local No. 113, also known as the Domestic Workers' Industrial Union, was established with 13 members who paid one dollar to join and pledged fifty cents a month afterward.

The Domestic Workers' Industrial Union, with Street as the guiding force and public face of the organization, served as an employment agency and was designed to improve working conditions by undermining the existing employment agencies. Through interviews with workers and newspaper help-wanted advertisements, the union created a card catalog of over 6,000 jobs, documenting wages, hours and working conditions. The union was successful in improving working condition for domestic servants in Denver by establishing a network of women who would reply to classified ads that were offering less than desirable conditions. The women would inform the potential employer that they would not work under these conditions. Street and the DWIU gained notoriety in Denver newspapers that claimed that the union was creating a blacklist of employers and that workers were sabotaging households. The union established a clubhouse for meetings and where out of work members had room and board.

In 1917 the charter for Local No. 113 was not replaced by the IWW, amid controversy about the finances of the union and Street's personal life. Street also responded to the declaration of the United States entering World War I, by pledging that the women could become traffic police, detectives, patrol officers and take on other work in all trades, which was not well received by the IWW. Street eventually left Colorado for San Diego, where she was arrested on December 29, 1919 for violating the California Criminal Syndicalism Act, after she was suspected of breaking into the mailbox of J. A. Stromquist and stealing his mail. Stromquist was a delegate of the IWW Street recently met and was since arrested in a raid of the American Legion. She was found not guilty of violating the California Criminal Syndicalism Act and was released on February 20, 1920, after spending 61 days in jail.

== Later life and legacy ==
Street continued her membership and involvement in the IWW, even after her arrest. In 1948, at age sixty-one, she returned to school to practice psychoanalysis as a consultant in social work. She also wrote poems, short stories and articles throughout her life. On April 25, 1966, she died in Los Angeles.

Street's organizing techniques were emulating in other cities and the successes of the DWIU inspired the establishment of six other locals, although none were able to solidify their efforts as the DWIU had. One of the marks success was the establishment of the Housewives' Assembly, which was created by the employing class in an attempt to counter the DWIU.
