= Terre Haute, Indiana =

Terre Haute
- City
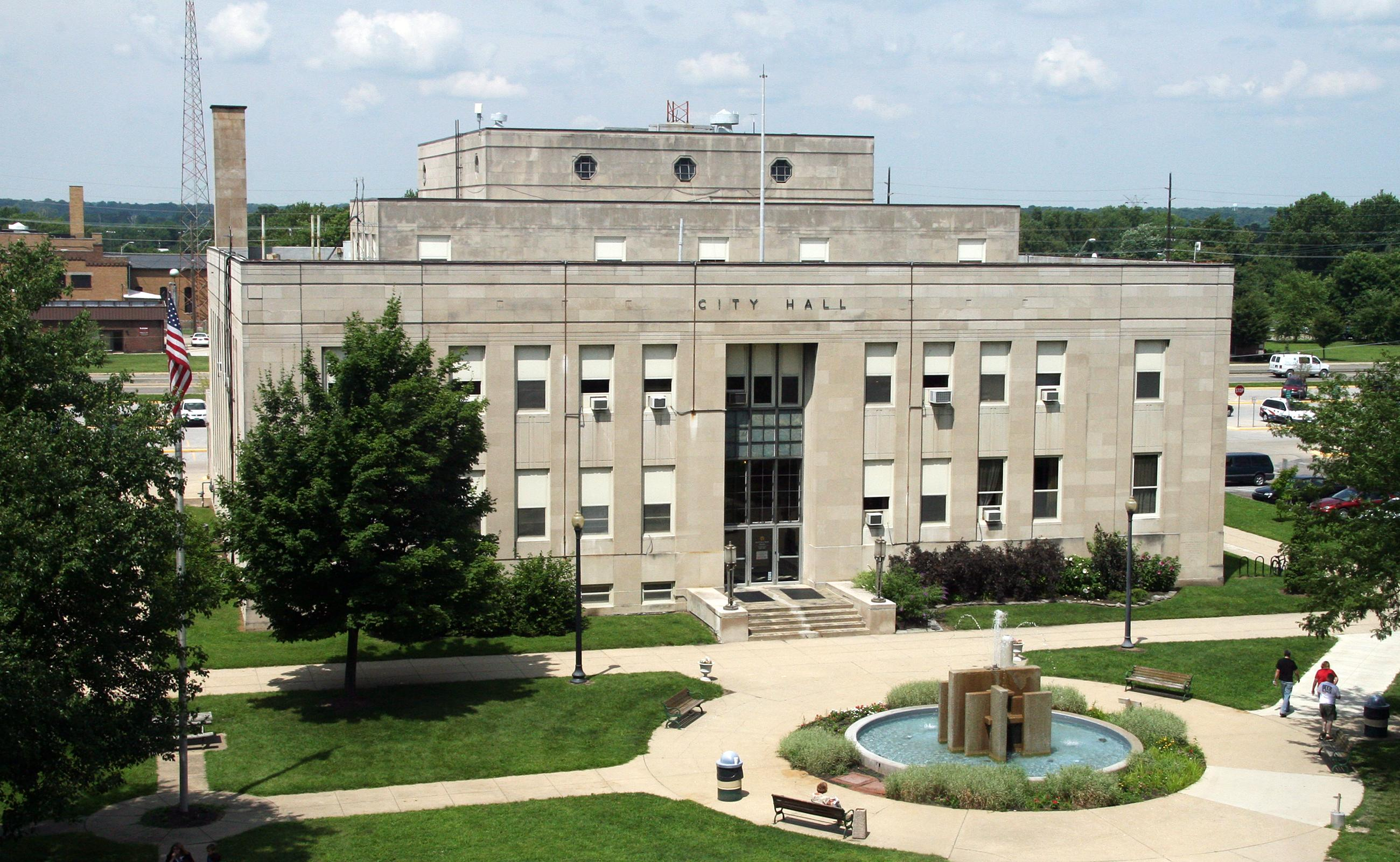
- Terre Haute City Hall in 2012

- Flag Seal
- Nicknames: "Queen City of the Wabash" "The Crossroads of America," "Capital of the Wabash Valley"
- Motto: "A Level Above"
- Interactive map of Terre Haute
- Location within Indiana Location within the United States
- Coordinates: 39°28′47″N 87°22′30″W
- Country: United States
- State: Indiana
- County: Vigo
- Townships: Harrison, Lost Creek, Honey Creek, Prairieton, Riley

Government
  - Type: Mayor-council
  - Body: Terre Haute City Council
  - Mayor: Brandon Sakbun (D)

Area
  - Total: 35.16 sq mi (91.07 km^{2})
  - Land: 34.77 sq mi (90.06 km^{2})
  - Water: 0.39 sq mi (1.01 km^{2})
- Elevation: 505 ft (154 m)

Population (2020)
  - Total: 58,389
  - Density: 1,679.2/sq mi (648.33/km^{2})
- Demonym(s): Hautean /ˈhoʊʃɪn/
- Time zone: UTC−5 (Eastern Time Zone)
  - Summer (DST): UTC−4 (EDT)
- ZIP Codes: 47801-47805, 47807-47809
- Area codes: 812 & 930
- FIPS code: 18-75428
- GNIS feature ID: 2396042
- Website: terrehaute.in.gov

Terre Haute (/ˈtɛrə ˈhoʊt/ TERR-ə HOHT) is a city in Vigo County, Indiana, United States, and its county seat. As of the 2020 census, the city had a population of 58,389 and its metropolitan area had a population of 168,716.

Located along the Wabash River about 5 miles (8 km) east of the state border with Illinois, Terre Haute is one of the largest cities in the Wabash Valley; it is known as the Queen City of the Wabash. The city is home to multiple higher-education institutions, including Indiana State University, Rose-Hulman Institute of Technology, and Ivy Tech Community College of Indiana. It also contains the United States Penitentiary, Terre Haute, which houses the US federal execution chamber and the primary federal death row for men.

== History ==
Terre Haute's name is derived from the French phrase terre haute (pronounced [tɛʁ ot] in French), meaning "highland". It was named by French-Canadian explorers and fur trappers to the area in the early 18th century to describe the unique location above the Wabash River (see French colonization of the Americas). At the time, the area was claimed by the French and British and these highlands were considered the border between Canada and Louisiana.

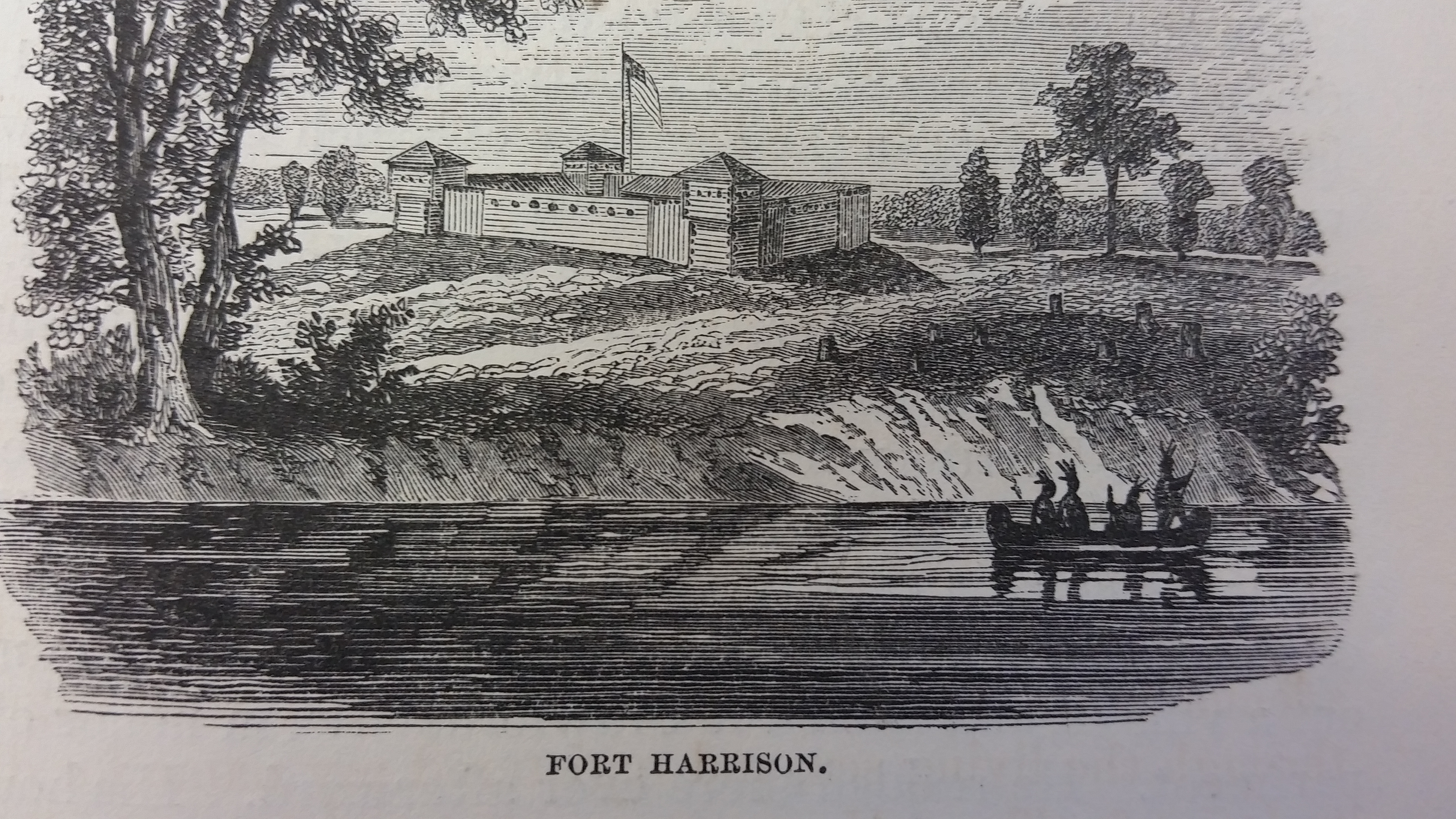
Fort Harrison was built in 1811 on the Wabash River near present-day Terre Haute.

The construction of Fort Harrison in 1811 marked the known beginning of a permanent population of European-Americans in the area that would become known as Terre Haute. A Wea Indian village already existed near the fort, and the orchards and meadows they kept a few miles south of the fort became the site of the present-day city. The village of Terre Haute, then a part of Knox County, Indiana, was platted in 1816.

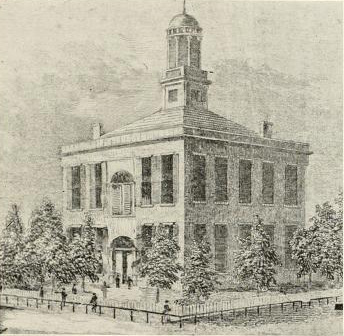
The first Vigo County Courthouse (1818–1866)

Terre Haute became the county seat of the newly formed Vigo County in 1818, leading to increased population growth. The village's estimated 1,000 residents voted to incorporate in 1832; the village was elevated to city status in 1853.

Early Terre Haute was a center of farming, milling, and pork processing. However, the city's pre-1960 business and industrial expansion occurred largely due to transportation. The Wabash River, the building of the National Road (now US 40), and the Wabash and Erie Canal linked Terre Haute to the world and broadened the city's range of influence. The economy was based on iron and steel mills, hominy plants, and late in the 19th century, distilleries, breweries, and bottle makers. Coal mines and coal operating companies developed to support the railroads, yet agriculture remained predominant, largely due to the role of corn in making alcoholic beverages and food items.

With steady growth and development in the latter part of the 19th century, the city's vibrant neighborhoods benefited from improved fire protection, the founding of two hospitals, dozens of churches, and a number of outlets for amusement. Terre Haute's position as an educational hub was fostered as several institutions of higher education were established. The city developed a reputation for its arts and entertainment offerings. Grand opera houses were built that hosted hundreds of operas and theatrical performances. It became a stop on the popular vaudeville circuit. The development of the streetcar system and later the electric-powered trolleys in the 1890s allowed residents to travel with ease to baseball games, picnics, river excursions, amusement parks, and even horse racing. The famous "Four-Cornered" Racetrack, now the site of Memorial Stadium, was laid out in 1886 and drew the best of the country's trotters and drivers.

On the evening of Easter Sunday, March 23, 1913, a major tornado struck the city around 9:45 pm, demolishing more than 300 homes, killing 21 people, and injuring 250. Damage to local businesses and industries was estimated at $1 million to $2 million (in 1913 dollars; $32–65 million in 2025 dollars). Up to that time, it was the deadliest tornado to hit Indiana. Heavy rains followed the tornado, causing the Wabash River to rise. By midday on Tuesday, March 25, West Terre Haute (Taylorville) was three-quarters submerged.

Like all U.S. communities, Terre Haute experienced economic swings as the country's economic base evolved. Before the Great Depression brought the U.S. economy to a near halt, influences such as Prohibition and the decline of the country's railroads had a negative effect on two of Terre Haute's major industries – distilleries/breweries and railroad repair works. In 1935 Terre Haute was the scene of a general strike, which eventually resulted in the implementation of martial law for several months.

In 1940, it was selected for a new United States penitentiary built on 1,126 acres (456 ha) south of the city.

World War II brought an economic upswing with the development of three ordnance plants in the county and the revitalization of the coal, railroad, and agriculture industries. Terre Haute remained dependent on consumer manufacturers such as Quaker Maid, the world's largest food processing factory under one roof. The city was an enthusiastic participant in the war effort with troop send-offs, victory gardens, bond sales, civil defense drills, parades, and ceremonies. The country's 100th United Service Organizations (USO) facility opened in the city in 1943.

Following the war, Terre Haute gained several new factories: Pfizer (1948), Allis-Chalmers (1951), Columbia Records (1954), and Anaconda Aluminum (1959). The face of downtown Terre Haute began to change in the late 1960s when Interstate 70 was built, passing through Vigo County about 5 mi (8.0 km) south of the path of U.S. 40 (Wabash Avenue). As traffic began to concentrate at the U.S. 41 interchange, many downtown businesses relocated to Honey Creek Mall shopping center, built in 1968.

Throughout the period, civic groups developed to work toward boosting the economy. The Terre Haute Committee for Area Progress developed the Fort Harrison Industrial Park in the 1970s. Grow Terre Haute in the mid-1980s encouraged the establishment of new stores, factories, and high-tech industrial parks that helped to stabilize the economy and enhance community life. Most encouraging was the arrival of the Digital Audio Disc Corporation (DADC), a subsidiary of the global company, Sony, as the first American factory designed exclusively to make compact discs. In other developments over these years, railroad overpasses eased traffic congestion, law enforcement strengthened, and several national and state awards for volunteerism and citizen participation boosted local pride.

Like other Midwest manufacturing cities, Terre Haute faced daunting challenges as it neared the end of the 20th century, including the outmigration of the population and the closure of long-time manufacturing operations.

Much of the city's resiliency can be attributed to the diversity of the local economy. Manufacturing continues to be an important part of that, due to the formation of the Vigo County Industrial Park. The efforts of the Terre Haute Economic Development Corporation, in cooperation with city and county government, have made the industrial park home to some of the world's leading companies – Companhia Siderúrgica Nacional's cold-rolled steel-processing facility, Staples Corporation's Midwest Distribution Center, Advics automotive brake systems manufacturing facility, ThyssenKrupp Presta's automotive steering systems manufacturing facility, and CertainTeed's fiber cement board manufacturing plant.

The revitalization of the downtown area can be traced to the construction of First Financial Bank's new headquarters building in the late 1980s and the creation of the city's first tax increment financing district, which funded the first downtown parking structure. Over the years, more initiatives followed, including the construction of several new office buildings and a second downtown parking structure.

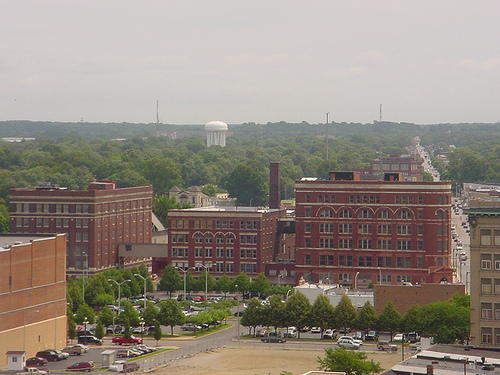
Clabber Girl factory complex in 2006

With the efforts of nonprofit groups such as Downtown Terre Haute and the expansion of the campus of Indiana State University, changes have spurred growth downtown. Several new hotels and businesses have been added to the "Crossroads of America" near 7th and Wabash, outdoor events and festivals attract crowds nearly every weekend during the summer, and the 7th Street Arts Corridor and Terre Haute Children's Museum, completed in 2010, enhance the appeal of the downtown area. These developments over several years inspired property owners throughout downtown to rehabilitate and renovate their buildings, including Hulman & Company. A new $25 million downtown convention center was completed in 2021.

Renovation of the city's 1930s-era Federal Building to house Indiana State University's Scott College of Business in 2010 and development of a new downtown location for Indiana State University Foundation and the university's bookstore in 2011 strengthened ties between the city and the university. In 2015, Indiana State University partnered with developers to build a student housing facility in the heart of downtown, and other downtown residential development followed.

A casino was proposed to be built on the east side of the city near U.S. Route 40/Indiana Route 46. In November 2019, a referendum on whether to allow the casino to be built passed overwhelmingly and it opened in March 2024.

== Geography ==
Terre Haute lies along the eastern bank of the Wabash River in western Indiana, about 75 mi (121 km) west of Indianapolis.

According to the 2010 census, Terre Haute has an area of 35.272 square miles (91.35 km^{2}), of which 0.732 square miles (1.90 km^{2}) (or 2.08%) is covered by water.

The Wabash River dominates the city's geography, forming its western border. Small bluffs on the east side of town mark the edge of the historic flood plain. Lost Creek and Honey Creek drain the city's northern and southern sections, respectively. In the late 19th century (particularly during the oil craze of 1889), several oil and mineral wells were productive in and near the center of town. Pioneer Oil of Lawrenceville, Illinois, began drilling for oil at 10th and Chestnut Streets on the Indiana State University campus in December 2013, the first oil well drilled in downtown Terre Haute since 1903.

Terre Haute is at the intersection of two major roadways: U.S. 40, originally from California to Maryland, and US 41, from Copper Harbor, Michigan, to Miami, Florida. US 41 and US 40 are called 3rd Street and Wabash Avenue within the city. Terre Haute is 77 mi (124 km) southwest of Indianapolis and within 185 mi (298 km) of Chicago, St. Louis, Louisville, and Cincinnati.

=== Climate ===
Climate in the city is characterized by relatively high summer temperatures, mean winter temperatures near freezing, and evenly distributed precipitation throughout the year. The Köppen climate classification this climate is Cfa (humid subtropical).

Climate data for Terre Haute, IN (Terre Haute Regional Airport) 1991-2020 normals, extremes 1896–present
Month	Jan	Feb	Mar	Apr	May	Jun	Jul	Aug	Sep	Oct	Nov	Dec	Year
Record high °F (°C)	69 (21)	76 (24)	86 (30)	89 (32)	99 (37)	108 (42)	109 (43)	102 (39)	104 (40)	94 (34)	82 (28)	74 (23)	109 (43)
Mean daily maximum °F (°C)	36.7 (2.6)	41.6 (5.3)	52.8 (11.6)	64.9 (18.3)	74.6 (23.7)	83.3 (28.5)	85.9 (29.9)	84.6 (29.2)	79.0 (26.1)	66.7 (19.3)	52.6 (11.4)	41.1 (5.1)	63.7 (17.6)
Daily mean °F (°C)	28.7 (−1.8)	32.9 (0.5)	42.8 (6.0)	53.9 (12.2)	64.0 (17.8)	72.7 (22.6)	75.3 (24.1)	73.6 (23.1)	66.6 (19.2)	54.9 (12.7)	43.1 (6.2)	33.5 (0.8)	53.5 (11.9)
Mean daily minimum °F (°C)	20.7 (−6.3)	24.1 (−4.4)	32.8 (0.4)	42.9 (6.1)	53.4 (11.9)	62.2 (16.8)	64.8 (18.2)	62.5 (16.9)	54.2 (12.3)	43.0 (6.1)	33.7 (0.9)	25.9 (−3.4)	43.4 (6.3)
Record low °F (°C)	−18 (−28)	−20 (−29)	−6 (−21)	19 (−7)	29 (−2)	37 (3)	43 (6)	43 (6)	30 (−1)	18 (−8)	−4 (−20)	−16 (−27)	−20 (−29)
Average precipitation inches (mm)	2.60 (66)	2.02 (51)	2.92 (74)	4.71 (120)	4.71 (120)	4.64 (118)	4.34 (110)	2.99 (76)	2.93 (74)	3.44 (87)	3.05 (77)	2.49 (63)	40.84 (1,037)
Average precipitation days (≥ 0.01 in)	8.9	9.0	10.6	11.4	13.1	11.7	11.2	9.5	8.8	9.4	8.9	10.1	122.6
Source: NOAA

== Demographics ==
Historical population
Census	Pop.	Note	%±
1850	4,051		—
1860	8,594		112.1%
1870	16,103		87.4%
1880	26,042		61.7%
1890	30,217		16.0%
1900	36,673		21.4%
1910	58,157		58.6%
1920	66,083		13.6%
1930	62,810		−5.0%
1940	62,693		−0.2%
1950	64,214		2.4%
1960	71,786		11.8%
1970	70,335		−2.0%
1980	61,125		−13.1%
1990	57,483		−6.0%
2000	59,614		3.7%
2010	60,785		2.0%
2020	58,389		−3.9%
U.S. Decennial Census

=== 2020 census ===
As of the 2020 census, Terre Haute had a population of 58,389 and 22,406 households, of which 11,747 were families. The city's population density was 1,679.15 inhabitants per square mile (648.3/km^{2}).

The median age was 34.1 years; 19.3% of residents were under the age of 18 and 15.3% were 65 years of age or older. For every 100 females there were 102.3 males, and for every 100 females age 18 and over there were 102.3 males age 18 and over.

Of the 22,406 households, 25.7% had children under the age of 18 living in them. Of all households, 31.6% were married-couple households, 23.9% were households with a male householder and no spouse or partner present, and 35.2% were households with a female householder and no spouse or partner present. About 37.8% of all households were made up of individuals, and 14.0% had someone living alone who was 65 years of age or older. The average household size was 2.24, and the average family size was 2.96.

There were 25,890 housing units at an average density of 749.6/sq mi (289.4/km^{2}); 13.5% were vacant. The homeowner vacancy rate was 3.0% and the rental vacancy rate was 13.1%.

About 99.7% of residents lived in urban areas, while 0.3% lived in rural areas.

Racial composition as of the 2020 census
Race	Number	Percent
White	46,125	79.0%
Black or African American	6,295	10.8%
American Indian and Alaska Native	244	0.4%
Asian	1,031	1.8%
Native Hawaiian and Other Pacific Islander	18	0.0%
Some other race	1,136	1.9%
Two or more races	3,540	6.1%
Hispanic or Latino (of any race)	2,273	3.9%

=== 2010 census ===
In the 2010 census, 60,785 people, 22,645 households, and 12,646 families were residing in Terre Haute with 107,878 people residing in Vigo County. The city's population density was 1,759.8 inhabitants per square mile (679.5/km^{2}). The 25,518 housing units had an average density of 738.8/sq mi (285.3/km^{2}). The racial makeup of the city was 83.5% White, 10.9% African American, 0.4% Native American, 1.4% Asian, 0.8% from other races, and 2.9% from two or more races. Hispanics or Latinos of any race were 3.1% of the population.

Of the 22,645 households, 28.8% had children under 18 living with them, 35.0% were married couples living together, 15.7% had a female householder with no husband present, 5.1% had a male householder with no wife present, and 44.2% were not families. About 34.9% of all households were made up of individuals, and 12.2% had someone living alone who was 65 or older. The average household size was 2.29, and the average family size was 2.95.

The median age in Terre Haute was 32.7 years. About 20% of residents were under 18; 18.3% were between 18 and 24, 26.4% were from 25 to 44, 22.6% were from 45 to 64, and 12.6% were 65 or older. The gender makeup of the city was 51.6% male and 48.4% female.

=== 2000 census ===
As of the census of 2000, 59,614 people, 22,870 households, and 13,025 families lived in the city. The population density was 1,908.3/sq mi (736.8/km^{2}). The racial makeup of the city was 86.3% White, 9.8% African American, 0.3% Native American, 1.2% Asian, 0.5% from other races, and 1.9% from two or more races. About 1.6% of the population was Hispanic or Latino of any race.

Of the 22,870 households, 27.2% had children under 18 living with them, 39.0% were married couples living together, 14.0% had a female householder with no husband present, and 43.0% were not families. About 34.9% of all households were made up of individuals, and 14.1% had someone living alone who was 65 or older. The average household size was 2.28, and the average family size was 2.95.

The median income for a household in Terre Haute was $28,018, and for a family was $37,618. Males had a median income of $29,375 versus $21,374 for females. The per capita income for the city was $15,728. 19.2% of the population and 14.8% of families were below the poverty line. Of the total population, 17.4% of those under the age of 18 and 11.4% of those 65 and older were living below the poverty line.

== Economy ==
=== Major employers ===
Major employers in Terre Haute include:

- Advics
- Amcor
- Casey's General Stores
- City of Terre Haute
- United States Federal Correctional Complex
- First Financial Bank
- GE Aviation has two facilities, a large structures fabrication facility, and a component repair facility
- Indiana State University
- Ivy Tech Community College
- Rose-Hulman Institute of Technology
- Sony Digital Audio Disc Corporation (Sony DADC)
- Taghleef Industries, Inc
- Union Health
- Vigo County School Corporation
- Vigo County

=== Terre Haute Federal Correctional Complex ===
Terre Haute is the location of the Federal Correctional Complex on Highway 63, two miles south of the city. The complex includes a medium-security federal correctional institution and a high-security United States penitentiary. The penitentiary houses the Special Confinement Unit for inmates serving federal death sentences and contains the federal government's execution chamber. The Terre Haute prison experiments were conducted here in 1943 and 1944 by Dr. John C. Cutler.

== Arts and culture ==
Terre Haute has made an effort to revitalize the businesses and culture in its downtown district. Festivals, museums, restaurants, shopping, and the addition of multiple hotels in the area have greatly improved the overall image of downtown Terre Haute. Its revitalization efforts were recognized in 2010 when the Indiana Chamber of Commerce named Terre Haute Indiana's Community of the Year.

=== Arts ===
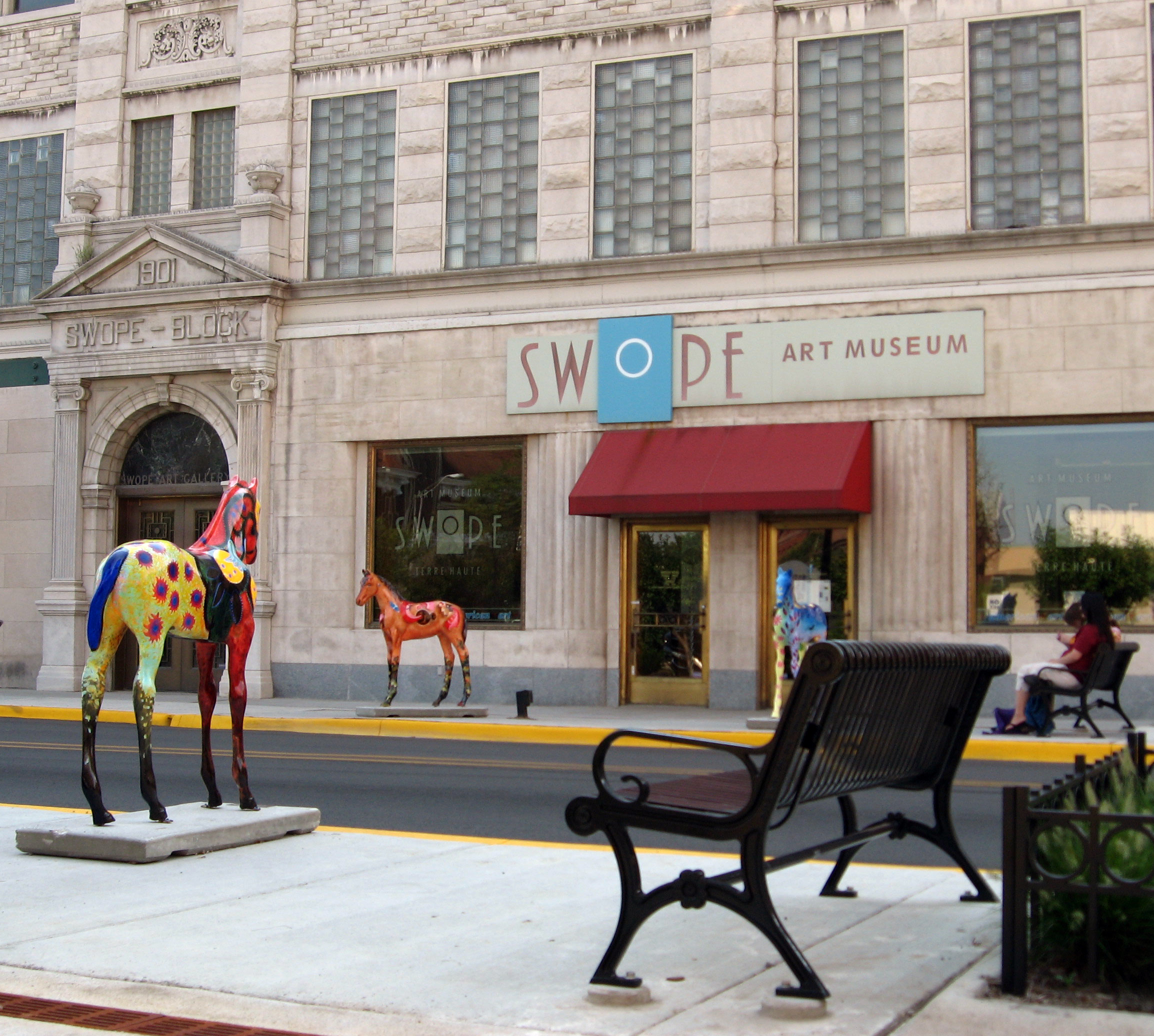
Swope Art Museum

Located on 7th Street between Wabash Avenue and Ohio Street, Terre Haute Arts Corridor includes the Swope Art Museum and two galleries - the Halcyon Contemporary Art Gallery and Gopalan Contemporary Art. The first Friday of every month, the area features art openings, musical performances, and socializing.

The Swope Art Museum, open and free to the public since 1942, has a collection of American art, including work by Edward Hopper, Grant Wood, Thomas Hart Benton, Janet Scudder, Andy Warhol, Robert Motherwell, Robert Rauschenberg, and many others.

The Turman Art Gallery at Indiana State University features rotating exhibitions by student and faculty artists. In 2007, the university was the recipient of nearly 150 Andy Warhol photographs and prints as part of the Andy Warhol Photographic Legacy Program. These additions were to be added to the other Andy Warhol prints already held in the university's permanent collection. The gallery's Permanent Art Collection and Study Collection includes a total of 3,600 paintings, sculptures, ceramics, drawings, prints, and photographs.

The cornerstone of the Terre Haute Arts Corridor is the historic Indiana Theater. Designed by famed theater architect John Eberson in Spanish Andalusian style and opened in 1922, this theater seats 1,674 and houses a screen measuring 54 ft × 33 ft (16 m × 10 m), which is the second-largest in the state. The theater, which had long sat vacant, was recently restored and is being used for concerts, film screenings, and other events.

Terre Haute is home to several arts nonprofits, including Wabash Valley Art Spaces and Arts Illiana.

=== Performing arts ===
Community Theatre of Terre Haute presented its first shows in 1928. A staple of the Terre Haute arts scene, Community Theatre is a volunteer theater producing five varied main stage plays and musical productions per year.

Terre Haute also features the Crossroads Repertory Theatre, a professional theater company with over a 40-year history. Its season is mid-June through late-July and performances include classic and new plays and musicals, as well as educational programs and staged reading of new plays.

Hatfield Hall is home to a 602-seat theater on the campus of Rose-Hulman Institute of Technology. A performing arts series has been held annually at Hatfield Hall for over 10 years. Indiana State University holds a performing arts series on its campus, as well. The performances of both series range from Broadway musicals, musical acts, and plays to lectures and dance productions.

=== Music ===
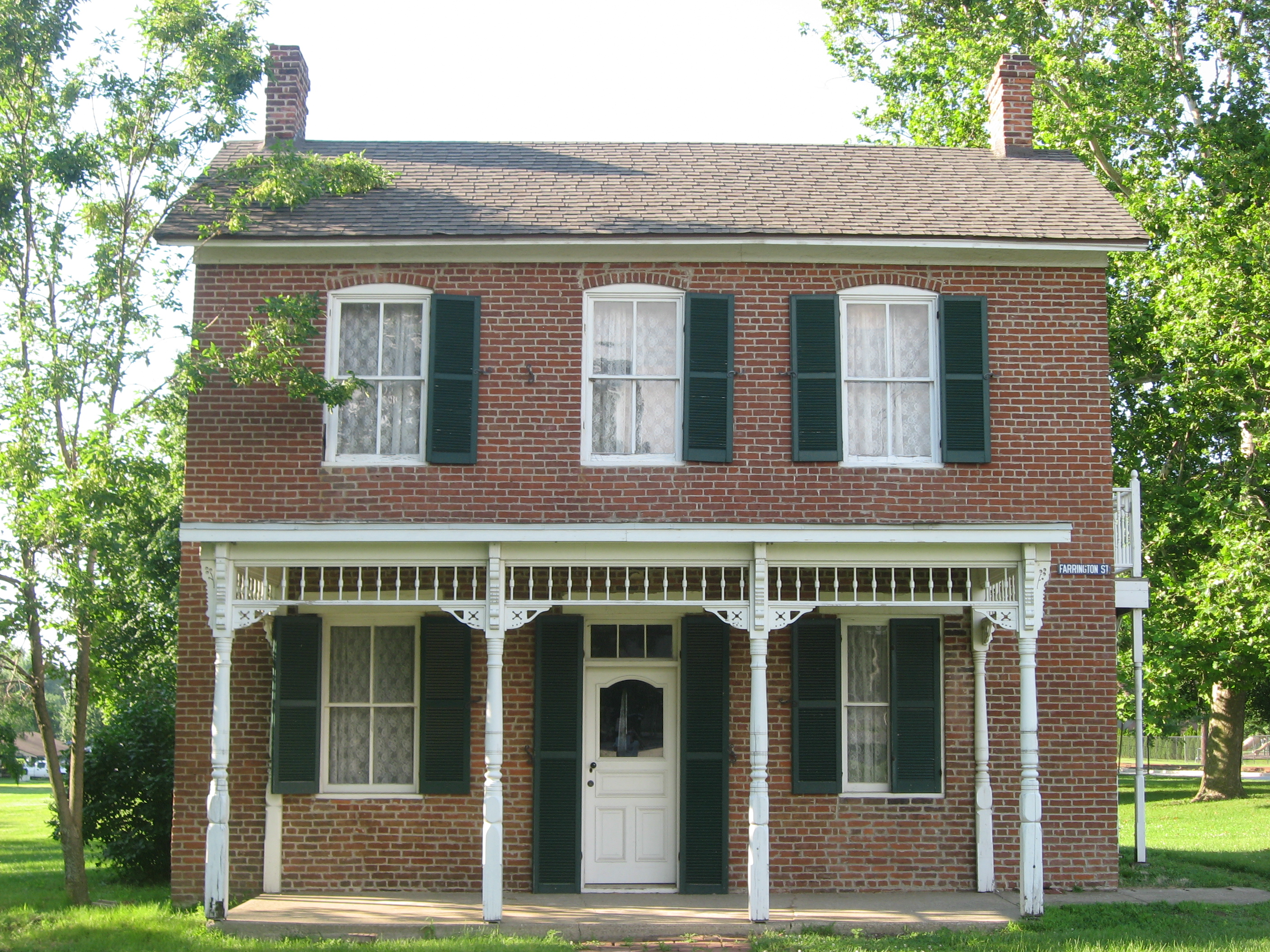
The Paul Dresser Birthplace in Fairbanks Park: Paul Dresser composed Indiana's state song, "On the Banks of the Wabash, Far Away".

Terre Haute has multiple music venues and a strong music community. The Wabash Valley Musicians Hall of Fame recognizes local musicians yearly.

Locally, the Blues at the Crossroads Festival brings more than 15,000 blues fans to the city the second weekend of September each year. A statewide high-school jazz festival is hosted annually by the Phi Mu Alpha chapter at Indiana State University. Terre Haute is also the birthplace of musician/actor Scatman Crothers.

The Terre Haute Symphony Orchestra, established in 1926, is the oldest professional orchestra in Indiana, antedating the Indianapolis Symphony by four years. The Terre Haute Symphony started as a volunteer group of musicians who provided community entertainment, and has evolved into a group of paid professional musicians who complete auditions to demonstrate their skill level. A series of concerts is offered from September through April, as well as a free Children's Concert for about 3,000 fourth graders from the Wabash Valley.

Terre Haute is also home to various other music organizations, such as the Terre Haute Community Band, Terre Haute Sinfonietta Pops Orchestra, Terre Haute Children's Choir, Terre Haute Masterworks Chorale, Banks of the Wabash Chorus (which performs in Harmony Hall), the Sweet Harmony Women's Barbershop Chorus, and the Wabash Valley Musicians Hall of Fame.

Terre Haute native Paul Dresser was a late 19th-century singer, actor, songwriter, and music publisher, who became "one of the most important composers of the 1890s". In 1913, the Indiana General Assembly named Dresser's biggest hit, "On the Banks of the Wabash, Far Away" as the state song of Indiana. The Paul Dresser Birthplace in Fairbanks Park is listed on the National Register of Historic Places. The Vigo County Historical Society operates the property as a museum, open by appointment. In 2014, a bronze sculpture, sponsored by Art Spaces and created by Teresa Clark to celebrate the composer, was dedicated in Fairbanks Park near the Dresser House.

=== Museums ===
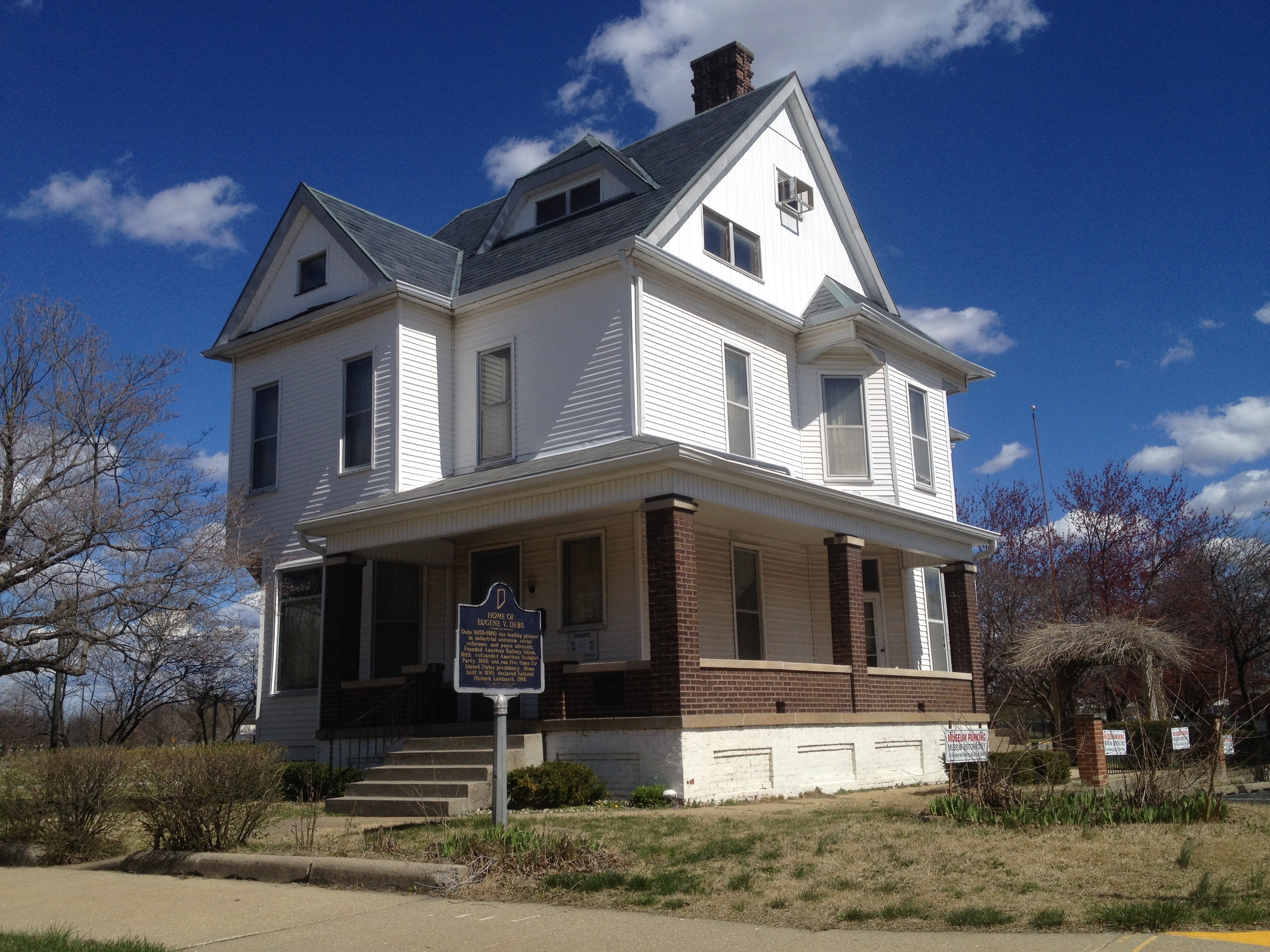
The Eugene V. Debs House, a National Historic Landmark and museum

The Vigo County Historical Society Museum boasts a collection of artifacts in downtown Terre Haute into a 40,000 square foot, four-level building constructed in 1895. A triangle of museums is located downtown, with the Terre Haute Children's Museum and the Clabber Girl Museum just blocks away.

The three-story Children's Museum is at the intersection of Wabash Avenue and Eighth Street in downtown Terre Haute. It is a hands-on science and technology museum that has educated over 230,000 adults and children from over 22 counties in Indiana and Illinois. It has traveling exhibits focused on weather and space that educate children of Wabash Valley schools. The museum is a participant in a national consortium of 14 science and technology museums.

The Clabber Girl Museum is at Wabash and Ninth Street in downtown Terre Haute. Housed in the Hulman & Company building built in 1892, the museum has exhibits on the history of Clabber Girl, one of the oldest brands in America, and on the art of baking. The museum is adjacent to the building where the Clabber Girl Baking Powder is still manufactured today.

Kleptz Antique Auto Museum, at 625 Poplar Street, displays antique cars, motorcycles, and other auto memorabilia. Styles include a 1902 clear plastic car, a 1963 Chrysler Turbine, and a 1932 Duesenberg with a Judkins body.

The CANDLES Holocaust Museum and Education Center, created by Holocaust survivor Eva Mozes Kor, has exhibits and artifacts related to the Holocaust, eugenics, and forgiveness.

The Indiana Association of Track and Field and Cross-Country Museum is a new addition to the Terre Haute Convention and Visitors Bureau.

Terre Haute was the home of Socialist Party of America leader and five-time presidential nominee Eugene V. Debs. His former home is now a museum on the campus of Indiana State University. It was declared a National Historic Landmark in 1966 and is now owned and operated by the Debs Foundation. The interior of the museum features many of Debs' possessions and other artifacts from his lifetime. It is open to the public.

== Sports ==
The Terre Haute Rex is Terre Haute's collegiate summer baseball team, founded in 2010. A member of the Prospect League, the team plays its home games at Bob Warn Field at ISU's Sycamore Stadium, The Rex's season runs from late May through early August. The team gets its name from a product with a historic connection to the community, Rex Coffee, roasted and packed in downtown Terre Haute by Clabber Girl Corporation and for many years a household name across the Midwest.

The history of professional baseball in Terre Haute goes back to 1884 includes Hall-of-Famers Mordecai Brown and Max Carey, Josh Devore, Negro League baseball all-star Junius Bibbs, Vic Aldridge, Art Nehf (who holds the National League record for most World Series games pitched), Paul "Dizzy" Trout, Jim "Jumbo" Elliott, Harry Taylor, and Bill Butland. More recent professional stars include pitcher Tommy John (who won 288 games in his 26-year major league career) and catcher Brian Dorsett, both of whom played for the New York Yankees during their careers. Terre Haute North graduate Josh Phegley played parts of eight major league seasons and currently coaches at Michigan, and Terre Haute South graduate A.J. Reed played parts of four seasons for the Astros and White Sox.

Terre Haute was represented for 53 season in various leagues, chiefly the Central League and the Three-I League, winning seven titles (1901, 1922, 1924, 1932, 1950, 1952, and 1953) during that time.

== Parks and recreation ==
Terre Haute has been recognized as a Tree City USA by the Division of Forestry for the Indiana Department of Natural Resources since 1999. The city has also received the Growth Award, which denotes a higher standard of excellence for urban forestry management. Indiana State University is one of four Tree Campuses in the state.

=== Terre Haute Parks Department ===
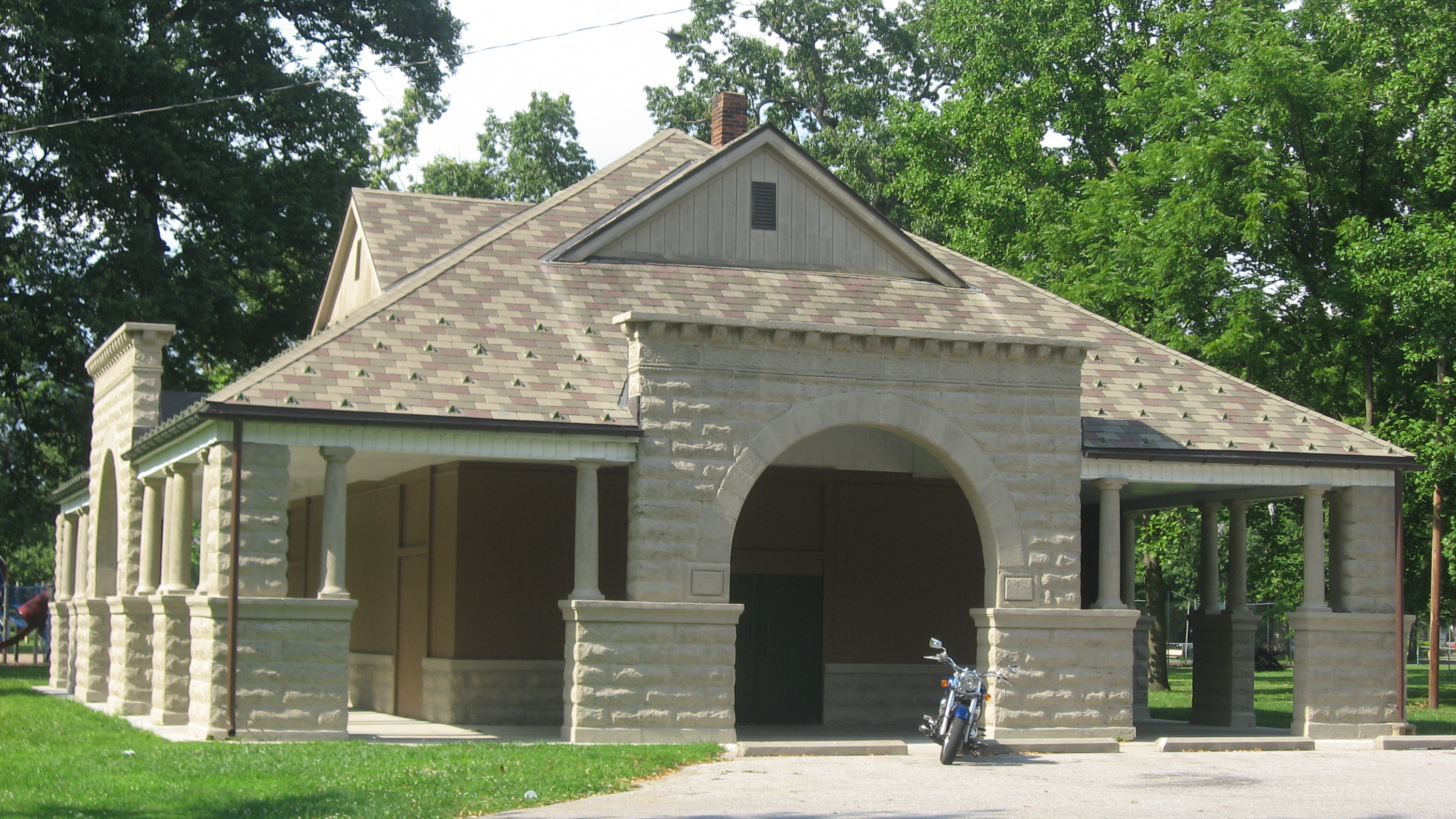
Pavilion in Collett Park

The Terre Haute Parks Department owns over 1,000 acres (400 ha) of dedicated land, including community parks, neighborhood parks, block parks, and two golf courses, as well as trails, greenways, and boulevards.

Some highlights of the Terre Haute Parks Department include:

- Deming Park – on the east side of Terre Haute at Fruitridge and Ohio Boulevard, it is the largest park, consisting of 177 acres (72 ha). It is home to the Oakley Playground, Clark-Lansdbaum Holly Arboretum, an 18-hole disc golf course, a public pool, the Spirit of Terre Haute Miniature Train, and a variety of sport facilitiesn including basketball and tennis courts.
- Dobbs Park – on the east side, Dobbs Park has a nature center and a Native American museum with an heirloom garden, a 3-acre (1.2 ha) pond, a restored prairie, a butterfly garden, and 3 miles (4.8 km) of trails that pass restored wetlands, through pine woods, old-growth and second-growth forest and a 25-acre (10 ha) state nature preserve.
- Herz-Rose Park — Renovated in 2026, this neighborhood park near Ben Franklin Elementary School has an Indiana Pacers Foundation funded basketball court, summer splash pad, accessible playground with climbing ropes, spinning chairs, metal slides, and swings, plus an indoor park shelter for event rentals.
- Fairbanks Park — Established in 1917, this park is a historic jewel in the heart of downtown. Located along the Banks of the Wabash River, this 42.7 acre park is home to the Banks of the Wabash Festival in late May, Rubber Duck Regatta in early July, as well as outdoor concerts at the bandshell. This park also has an emphasis on sports and recreation, with the baseball diamond, YMCA, canoe/kayak boat launch, fishing dock, and dog park. Plans are underway to expand amenities as part of a new master plan for long-term development.
- National Road Heritage Trail – a multi-use paved trail, it extends about 6.5 miles (10.5 km) from the Twigg Rest Area to the Indiana State University campus. It is used for running, walking, biking, and rollerblading.

=== LaVern Gibson Championship Cross-Country Course ===
The LaVern Gibson Championship Cross Country Course has the distinction of being one of the few purpose-built cross-country courses in the world. The facility is part of 240 acres (0.97 km^{2}) that comprise the Wabash Valley Family Sports Center east of Terre Haute. The course is built on a reclaimed coal mine and consists of an external loop of 3 km (1.9 mi) and four internal loops that allow for circuits of varying lengths. Indiana State University's cross-country team uses the Gibson Course for its home meets. The course has also hosted NCAA national championship meets.

== Government ==
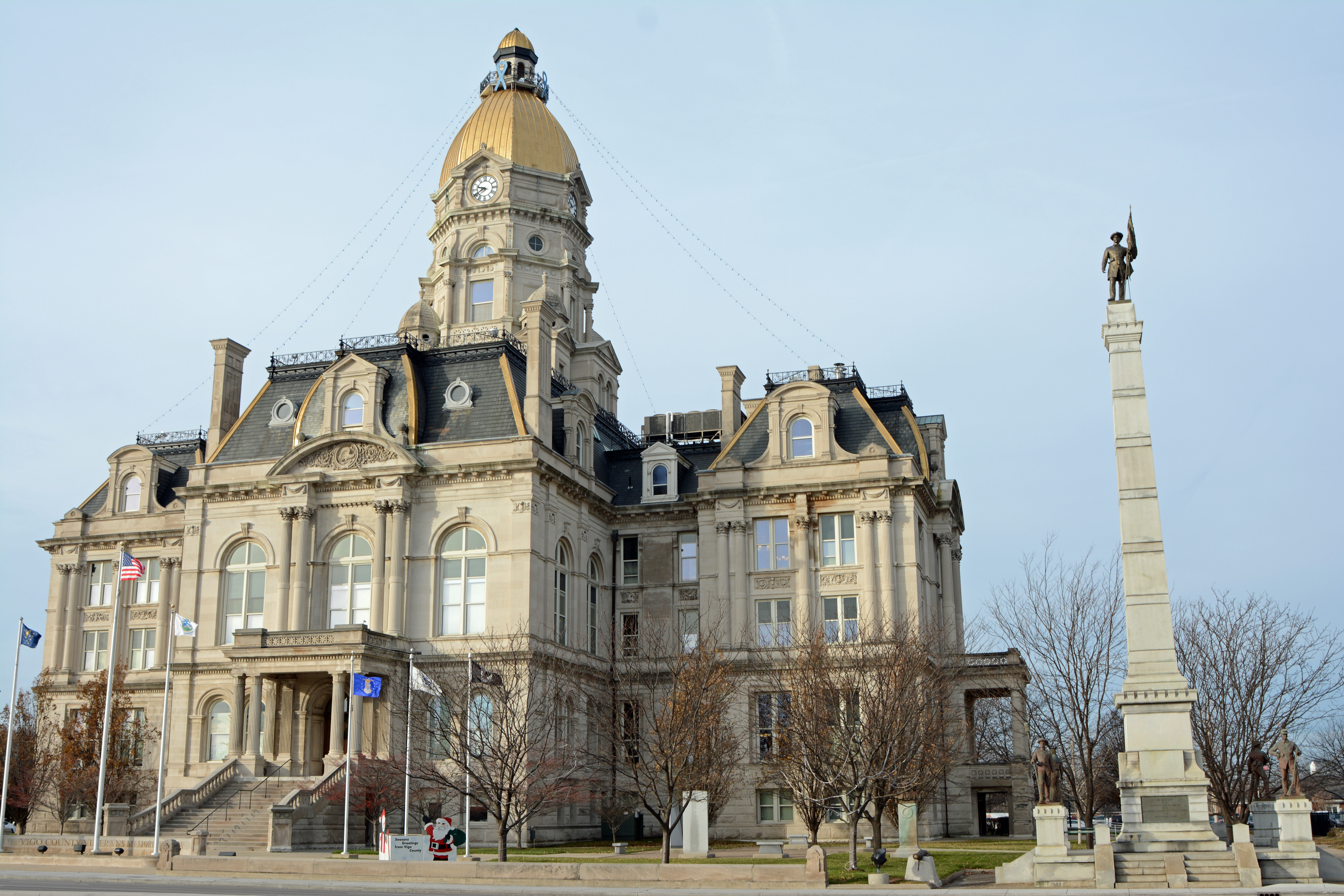
Vigo County Courthouse

Brandon Sakbun began his first term as Terre Haute's mayor in January 2024. During the 2023 mayoral election, Sakbun defeated incumbent Duke Bennett, who had served as mayor since 2008. Sakbun received 59% of the vote and is the youngest mayor in the city's history at 27.

The city council has six members, each representing a district, and three at-large members.

== Education ==
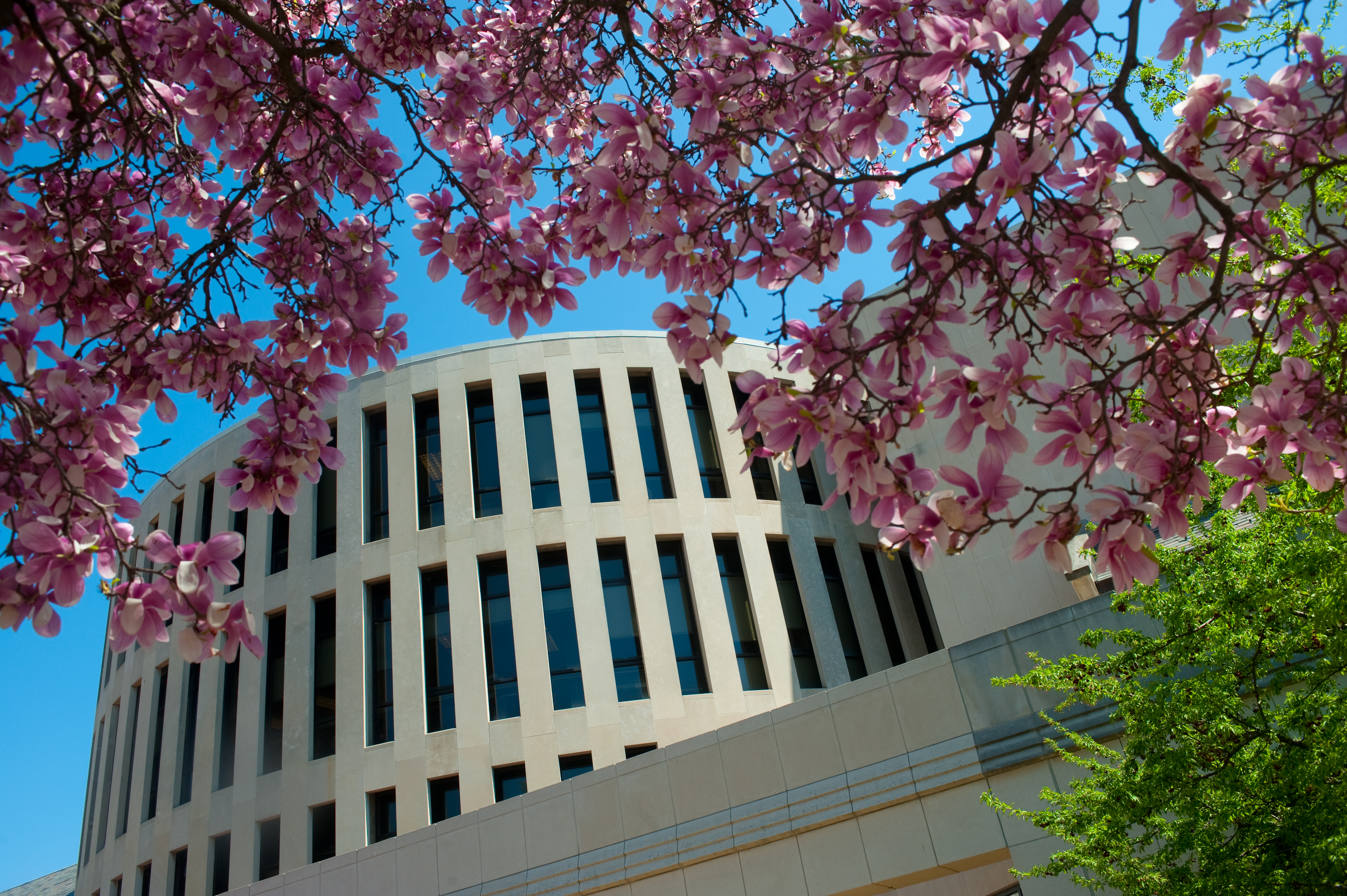
Rankin Hall, on the campus of Indiana State University

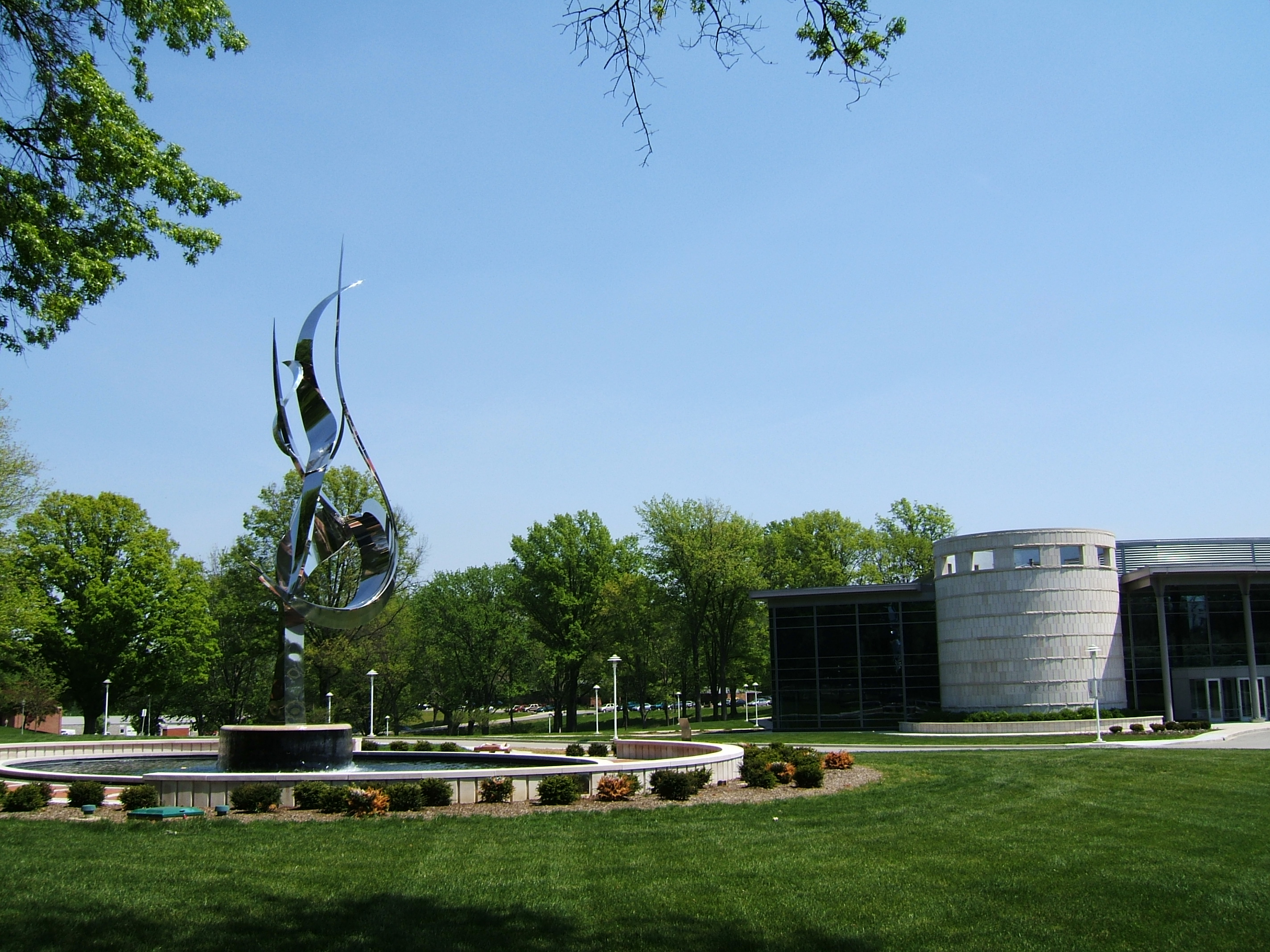
Campus of Rose-Hulman Institute of Technology, founded in 1874

Terre Haute is served by the Vigo County School Corporation. The corporation manages 18 elementary schools, five middle schools, three high schools, and two alternative schools, enrolling 14,642 students from kindergarten to grade 12.

Terre Haute is also home to several higher-education establishments.

Indiana State University (ISU) is in downtown Terre Haute. As of August 2024, it has an enrollment of 7,895. The Princeton Review placed ISU on its "Best in the Midwest" list of colleges and universities for nine consecutive years. ISU was also included in the Forbes' "America's Top 650 Colleges."

Rose-Hulman Institute of Technology is a private engineering school just east of the city. For 20 consecutive years, U.S. News & World Report has ranked it the nation's number-one undergraduate engineering school among institutions whose highest degree in engineering is the Master's. It has an enrollment near 2,200 students on its 200-acre (81 ha) campus.

There is also a campus of Ivy Tech Community College of Indiana, a full-service community college which is part of the statewide system, in Terre Haute.

The city has a lending library, the Vigo County Public Library.

== Media ==
=== Movies ===
The two lead characters in Joseph Losey's 1951 the movie The Prowler, Webb Garwood (played by Van Heflin) and Susan Gilvray (played by Evelyn Keyes), come from Terre Haute.

=== Newspaper ===
- Tribune Star

=== Magazines ===
- Terre Haute Living
- Wabash Valley Business Monthly

=== Television ===
- WTWO - NBC affiliate - Channel 2.1 (CW+ - 2.2; Laff - 2.3; Antenna TV - 2.4)
- WTHI - CBS affiliate - Channel 10.1 (Fox/MyNet - 10.2; MeTV - 10.3; Ion - 10.4; MeTV Toons - 10.5)
- WAWV - ABC affiliate - Channel 38.1 (Grit - 38.2; Bounce - 38.3; Rewind TV - 38.4)

=== Radio ===
- WISU - 89.7 FM - NPR (Rebroadcasts WFYI)
- WZIS - 90.7 FM - Variety
- WHOJ - 91.9 FM - Religious (Catholic)
- WFNF - 92.7 FM - Active Rock
- WEHP - 93.7 FM - Silent
- W236AE - 95.1 FM - Classical (Rebroadcasts 103.7 WFIU)
- WHLR - 95.9 FM - Classic Country
- WMKI-LP - 96.9 FM - Alternative/Indie
- WWVR - 98.5 FM - Classic Rock
- WTHI - 99.9 FM - Country
- WMGI - 100.7 FM - Top40/Pop
- WBOW - 102.7 FM - Classic Hits
- WVIG - 105.5 FM - Classic country
- WYLJ - 107.5 FM - Religious (3ABN Radio)
- WFNB - 1130 AM / 99.5 FM / 106.9 FM - Sports
- WIBQ - 1230 AM / 97.9 FM - News Talk
- WPFR - 1480 AM / 106.3 FM - Conservative Talk

== Infrastructure ==
=== Transportation ===
==== Airports ====
Two airports serve Terre Haute. The Terre Haute Regional Airport is home to Hulman Field (HUF). The airport has a partnership with multiple military units including the 181st Intelligence Wing of the Indiana Air National Guard. It also houses a flight academy through ISU. Sky King Airport is 2 miles (3.2 km) north of Terre Haute and mostly serves training and recreational flights.

==== Highways ====
- Interstate 70 to St. Louis (west) and Indianapolis (east): Terre Haute is served by multiple exits. Exit 11 connects with State Road 46, and Exit 7 connects with U.S. 41 on the southwest side of the city. Exit 3 serves West Terre Haute, Indiana, via Darwin Road, which provides easy access to downtown Terre Haute via US 150. Exit 1 onto National Drive is marked for both Terre Haute and West Terre Haute, but is only accessible via the eastbound lanes of I-70.
- US 40 to Effingham (west) and Indianapolis (east). Travels with Interstate 70. US 40 ran through Terre Haute on Wabash Ave., but in January 2011 INDOT gave the road to the city and paid the city to take care of Wabash Ave.
- US 41 to Rockville (north) and Evansville (south). It is the main north–south thoroughfare on Terre Haute's west side. From Maple St. south to I-70, it is marked as 3rd St.; along this stretch is US-41's interchange with I-70.
- US 150 enters Terre Haute from neighboring West Terre Haute, Indiana. At 3rd St., US-150 turns south, following the path of US-41.
- SR 46 begins at its intersection with US 40 just west of Rose-Hulman. From here, the highway runs south with US 40 to an interchange with I-70. The road then heads through Riley on its way to Bloomington.
- SR 63 enters Terre Haute on the city's north side crossing the Wabash River. SR 63 ends at the interchange with US 41 on the north side of town.
- SR 641, also known as the Terre Haute Bypass, is a limited access highway running from the interchange of IN-46 and I-70 to US-41 near the industrial park on the city's southside.
- SR 42 serves the far eastern edge of the city and passes by Terre Haute Regional Airport. It ends at an intersection with US 40 and IN-46.

==== Bus service ====
All city and intercity buses serve the downtown Cherry Street Multi-Modal Transportation Facility.

- The Terre Haute Transit Utility provides bus service via seven day and three evening routes throughout the city. The system's ridership in 2012 was 376,763. The municipal buses are free of charge since 2025.
- Greyhound Lines provides interstate bus service (St. Louis—Indianapolis).
- Miller Transportation Hoosier Ride provides daily round trip express and local bus service to Indianapolis.

==== Railways ====
Historically, the city was a rail hub. The New York Central Railroad used the Big Four Depot. Its last train was the St. Louis-New York City Southwestern Limited in 1967. The last train serving Terre Haute, Amtrak's Kansas City, Missouri-New York City train, National Limited, stopped running in 1979.

The Chicago & Eastern Illinois Railroad, Chicago, Milwaukee, St. Paul and Pacific Railroad ('Milwaukee Road') and the Pennsylvania Railroad used Union Station. Prior to the 1971 establishment of Amtrak, the Penn Central (combined company after the merger of the New York Central and the Pennsylvania Railroad), ran these St. Louis-New York City trains through Terre Haute: Penn Texas and the Spirit of St. Louis. Until 1965 the C&EI ran the Dixie Flyer from Chicago through Terre Haute, to Evansville, Nashville, Atlanta, and on to Jacksonville, Florida. Until 1968 the C&EI ran the Georgian from Chicago through Terre Haute, on the same route to Atlanta. Up to the same time, the C&EI ran through Terre Haute the New Orleans-bound Humming Bird.

== Notable people ==
- Charles G. Abrell, United States Marine Medal of Honor recipient
- Ray Arcel, boxing coach
- Birch Bayh, former U.S. Senator from Indiana
- Mordecai Brown, Hall of Fame Major League Baseball pitcher; baseball manager
- Max Carey, Hall of Fame Major League Baseball player
- Helen Corey, cookbook author, television producer, educator
- Scatman Crothers, musician and actor
- Eugene V. Debs, Indiana State Senator, and leader of the Socialist Party of America
- Terry Dischinger, National Basketball Association player
- Theodore Dreiser, author of Sister Carrie and An American Tragedy
- Paul Dresser, singer, songwriter (On the Banks of the Wabash, Far Away)
- Zhivago Duncan, contemporary artist
- Max Ehrmann, author of "Desiderata"
- Philip José Farmer, speculative fiction and fantasy author
- Ruben Gonzales, professional tennis player
- Richard Goodall, American singer
- Tony Hulman, former owner of the Indianapolis Motor Speedway
- Tommy John, pitcher for the Chicago White Sox and New York Yankees
- Howard Andrew Jones, speculative fiction and fantasy author and editor
- William G. Kerckhoff, businessman, co-founder of Beverly Hills, California
- John E. Lamb, U.S. representative from Indiana
- Emil W. Leipziger, rabbi
- Bobby Leonard, former coach of the Indiana Pacers
- Clyde Lovellette, Hall of Fame Basketball player
- Alexander Lyons, rabbi
- Mick Mars, guitarist of Mötley Crüe
- Dusty May, basketball coach,University of Michigan coach, won 2026 NCAA Division I men's basketball tournament
- Ernestine Myers, dancer and dance educator
- Art Nehf, an American baseball pitcher, played 15 seasons in Major League Baseball
- Teresa Hord Owens, President of the Christian Church (Disciples of Christ)
- Craig Porter Jr., National Basketball Association player
- Susan Porter Rose, Chief of Staff to the First Lady of the United States (1989–1993)
- Apsara Sakbun, Olympian
- Brandon Sakbun, mayor
- John T. Scott, Justice of the Indiana Supreme Court
- Janet Scudder, sculptor, painter, and high school art teacher
- Abe Silverstein, aerospace engineer
- Gage Skidmore, photographer
- John Gould Stephenson, Librarian of Congress
- Jane Street, labor organizer
- Catherine A. Streeter, businesswoman and gaming expert
- Bill Thompson, voice of Droopy Dog and Wallace Wimple
- Lynne Topping, actress
- Margaret Hoberg Turrell, composer and philanthropist

== Legends ==
One well-known Terre Haute legend is the story of Stiffy Green, a stone bulldog that allegedly at one time guarded the mausoleum in Highland Lawn Cemetery of florist John G. Heinl, the brother-in-law of Eugene V. Debs and the father of journalist Robert Debs Heinl. The statue is now housed in the Vigo County Historical Society Museum, in Terre Haute.

== In media ==
Comedian Steve Martin referred to Terre Haute as "Nowhere, U.S.A." in an interview with Playboy in 1978. He made these claims after a performance in the same year where he stated that he had difficulty finding any open downtown restaurants. He then was invited back to take a tour of the city in December 1979. He then premiered his film The Jerk at one of the city's theaters. In Martin's 1982 film Dead Men Don't Wear Plaid, he mocked Terre Haute at the end. He saved the world from being decimated by a cheese bomb, and only Terre Haute was hit. Martin then says "Damn, and they were about to get a public library.

== Sister cities ==
Terre Haute has two sister city relationships:

- Tajimi, Gifu, Japan (established in 1960s)
- Tambov, Russia

== See also ==
- List of people from Terre Haute, Indiana
- List of place names of French origin in the United States
- List of public art in Terre Haute, Indiana
