= Leonardo Nierman =

Mexican artist (1932–2023)

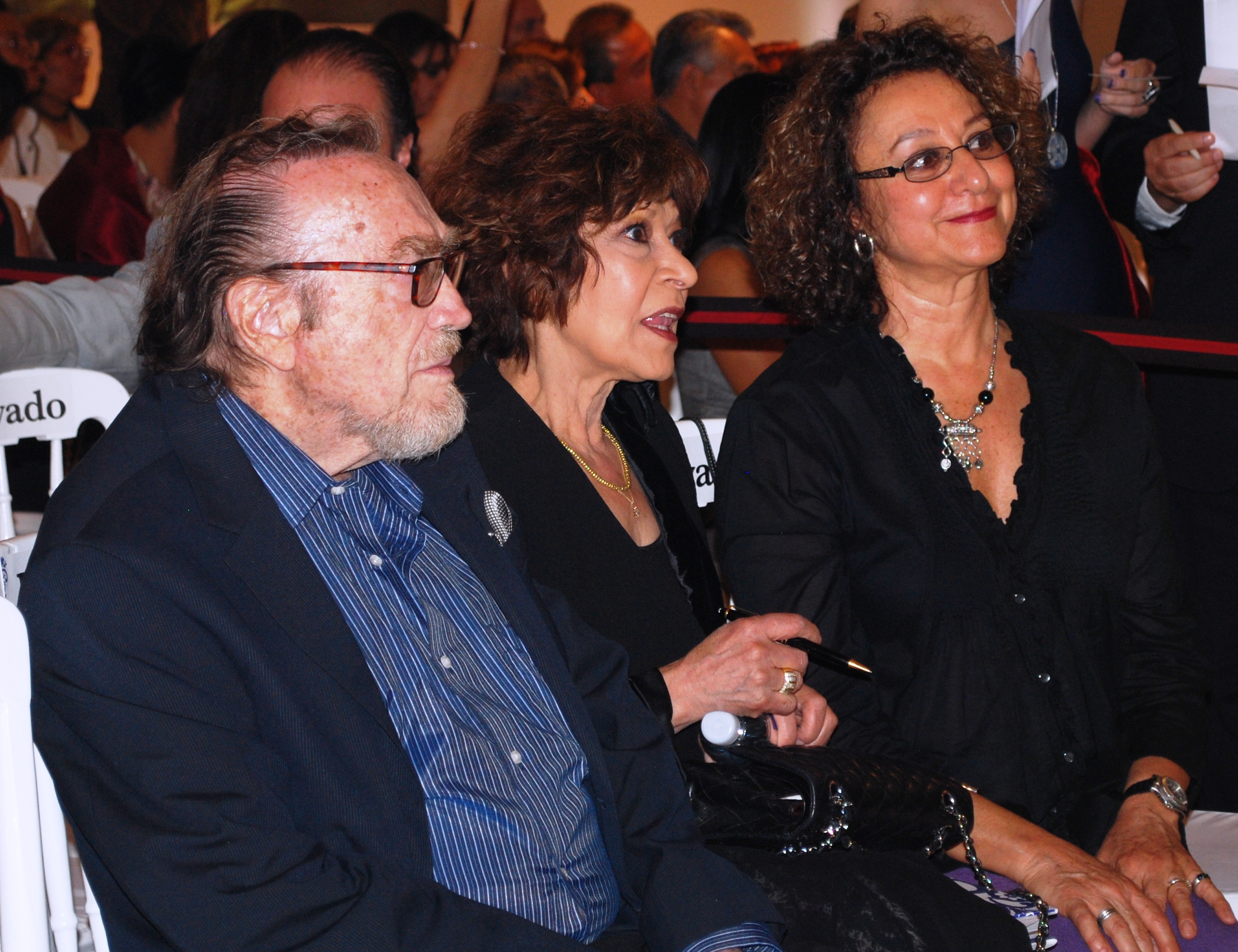
Leonardo Nierman, with Cristina Pacheco and artist Eugenia Marcos at a Uriarte Talavera event at the El Palacio de Hierro in Mexico City

Leonardo Nierman Mendelejis (November 1 1932 – June 7 2023) was a Mexican artist mostly known for his painting and sculpture. He at first wanted to be a violinist, but gave it up after twenty years when he compared a recording of his playing with that of Yehudi Menuhin. However, his musical training has been a major influence on his painting and sculpture, reproducing movement and harmony as Nierman sees similarities between the two disciplines. Nierman had had exhibitions in Mexico and abroad and over sixty recognitions of his work, half of which are from outside Mexico. His work is abstract but still with discernible images from nature such as birds, water, lightning and more. His paintings are in pure colors while his sculptures are generally of metal, often silver-toned.

== Life ==
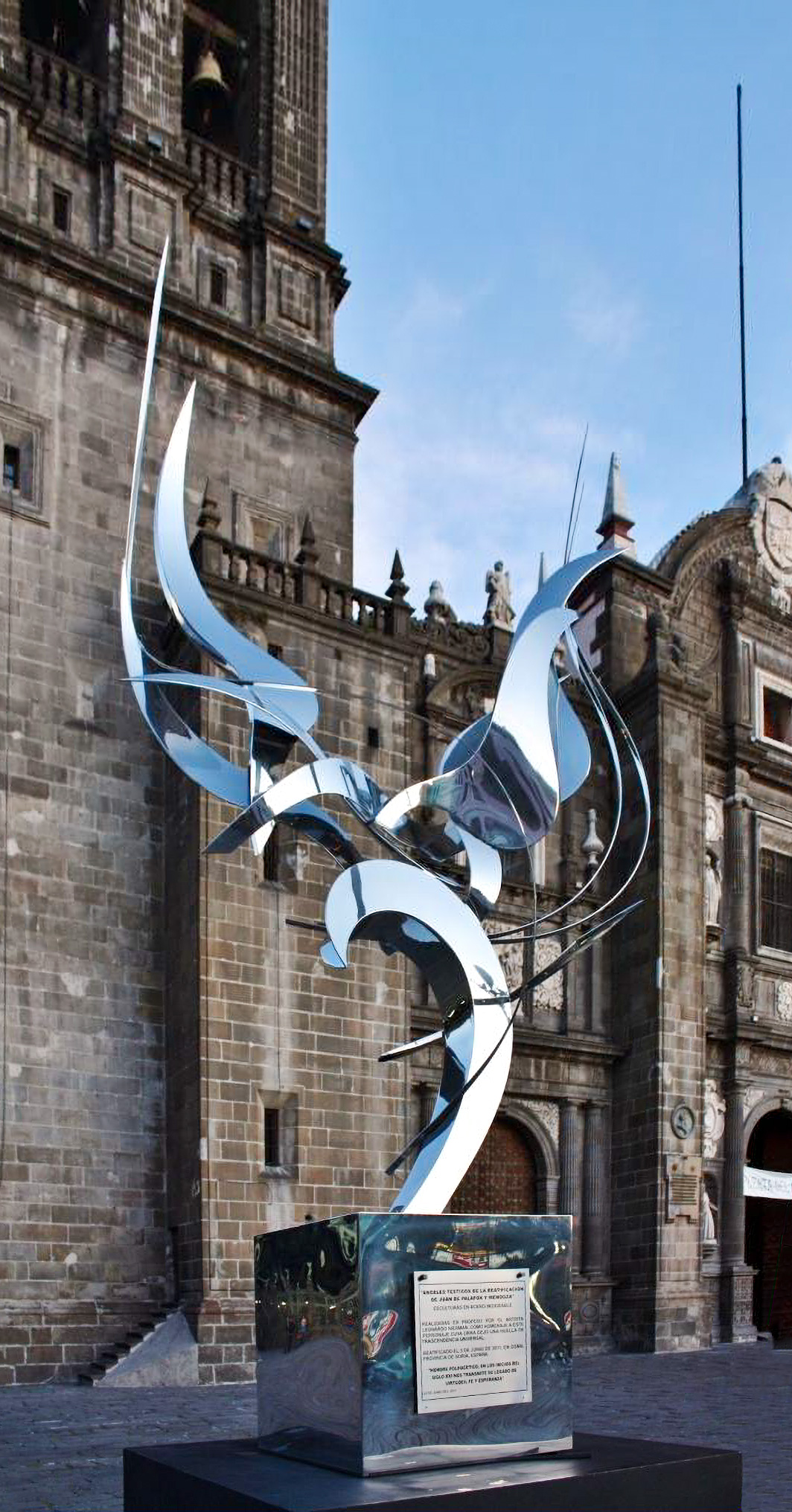
Ángeles testigos de la Beatificación de Juan de Palafox y Mendoza, a sculpture commemorating the beatification of Juan de Palafox y Mendoza, in the city of Puebla, Mexico.

Leonardo Nierman Mendelejis was born in Mexico City on 1 November 1932. He was the only child of Lithuanian Jewish parents Clara Mendelejis, a bakery worker and Chanel Nierman, a bus inspector who later started a small jacket factory. Nierman's parents arrived to Mexico in the mid-1920s, his father from Lithuania and his mother from Ukraine, both poor. The two met in Mexico.

When he was a child, he wanted to be a musician and dedicated himself to the violin for two decades. At that time, art did not attract him although he remembers seeing the murals of Diego Rivera and José Clemente Orozco but with little reaction except anger upon seeing some vandalism on an Orozco mural. To pursue music, he began with private violin lessons and attended the National Conservatory of Music of Mexico for a while. He even gave some recitals in the Palacio de Bellas Artes. He gave up the violin when he heard a recording of himself playing Symphonie espagnole by Édouard Lalo, and then comparing his interpretation with that of Yehudi Menuhin.

At first, he thought he had wasted his time with the violin but had since decided that it gave him his philosophy on life and prepared him for his painting and sculpture. After he left music, he began to be attracted to color, but he remained attached to music, especially artists such as Bach, Debussy, Mahler and Stravinsky. However, he was still hesitant about painting. He remembered that one day he was walking in the historic center of Mexico City and found an artist's supply shop and thought about taking up painting as a hobby, but then thought he could not because of lack of preparation.

Despite his affinity for the arts, Nierman's formal education was not in this field. He graduated from preparatory in 1951, with a concentration in physics and mathematics. In 1953, he studied the psychology of color and form in static and moving bodies. He also began spending large amounts of time in museums. He completed a bachelor's in business administration at the Universidad Nacional Autónoma de México but never pursued this career because he had begun to paint, including a mural at his school. He began painting on his own in his bedroom in his parents’ home. He never thought he would become professional but little by little the activity began to consume most of his time, becoming a self-taught artist.

Nierman died on 7 June 2023, at the age of 90.

== Career ==
Nierman began his career painting when he convinced the dean of the business school where he was a student, to paint a mural at the department's auditorium in 1956. To paint the mural, he made an appointment with David Alfaro Siqueiros to ask for advice, receiving such especially the mixing of colors. The mural was later destroyed when the wall was taken down.

Nierman had been painting for a while when Raquel Tibol invited him to exhibit his work at the Centro de Deportes Israeli in Mexico City. He told himself that if he did not sell a single painting, he would quit. Two paintings were purchased and were then seen by the owner of IFA Gallery in Washington, DC. Since 1959, this gallery has exhibited Nierman's work and opened doors for him internationally.

From then, he held over 100 exhibitions in the Americas, Asia, Australia and Europe. More recent exhibitions include the Universidad Autónoma de Coahuila in 2000, the International Museum of Art & Science in Mcallen, Texas in 2009, the MACAY museum in Mérida in 2012, the Francisco Cossío Museum in San Luis Potosí in 2012, and the art gallery of the Complejo Cultural Universitario in the city of Puebla in 2012.

His work can be found in museums and public buildings in Australia, Austria, Colombia, Costa Rica, the United States, Spain, Israel, Japan, Mexico, Monaco, Panama, Sweden and Thailand. These include the gallery of the Vatican, the Art Institute of Chicago, the Museum of Fine Arts in Boston, the Museo de Arte Moderno in Mexico City, the Memorial Art Gallery in Rochester, The Art Modern Gallery of New York and Phoenix Art Museum.

His monumental works can be found in many of Mexico's major cities and abroad. In 1969 he painted a mural for the physics department at Princeton as well as designed the stained glass windows for Temple Beth Israel in Lomas de Chapultepec. His metal sculptures appear in places such as universities, concert halls, research centers, libraries, cultural centers, atriums and parks in countries such as Canada, the United States, Ecuador and Lithuania. These include the Flame of the Millennium commissioned by Howard C. Alper, which is at the Ohio Street interchange of the Kennedy Expressway in Chicago, Eternal Light at the Outpatient Care Center of the University of Illinois Medical Center in Chicago and Sensación de Vuelo at the Lambert-St. Louis International Airport.

In 1997 he created a limited edition postage stamp for the Mexican postal service.

Nierman received over sixty recognitions, half of them from outside Mexico. Recognitions including Honorific Mention at UNAM (1960), member of the Instituto de Artes in Mexico (1964), lifetime member of the Royal Society of the Arts in London (1965), Palme d'Or des Beaux Arts from Monaco (1969), Royce Medal (New York, 1970), League of Art Gold Medal (Chicago, 1980), Golden Centaur and honorary master's of painting from the Academy of Italy (1982), named European Academic by the Centro Studi Di Recerch L Accademia D Europa in Italy (1984) and the winner of the sculpture competition at the University of Central Florida (1988). In 1993, he became a patron of the Academy of St Martin in the Fields in London. In 1995 he received an honorary doctorate from Concordia University in Irvine, California. The city of Chicago named 19 December in his honor in 2002. In 2003 he received the Gloria Award from the International Latino Cultural Center in Chicago. In 2010 he received the Vasco de Quiroga Medal from the Mexico City government. UNAM named a classroom designed for cultural activities after the painter in 2011.

== Artistry ==
His artistic production includes painting, tapestry design, sculpture, murals, engraving and glass work. His first artwork was done in the 1950s, influenced by the work of Kandinsky, Klee, Miró and Chirico, as well as the abstract, cubist and surrealist movements. However, much of his later work had been shaped by his interpretation of nature and a search for the relationship between abstract art and the cosmos, spurred by his studies of color and movement in the 1950s. The other major influence has been his musical background. He stated that music and painting are very much alike — both have tonalities, rhythms, high-intensity areas and resting areas. He has been called the Jackson Pollock of Latin American art.

His work has been classified as “magical expressionism.” He painted abstract forms with movement and rhythm using bright colors. His work is not narrative. He described his work as an interaction of colors which create a moment. While abstract, elements of nature are present in his works with elements such as wind, water, lightning, fire and volcanic eruptions.

In his painting, he preferred to work with clean pigments as the mixing of colors tend to dull the effect of light. When he painted, he said it was like going crazy. He did not know at that time if the work is good or not only that it makes him feel. It was not conscious or planned. Nierman has said: Painting is to me the aperture through which it is possible to enter a certain world; in it the viewer may find an endless number of magic images, objects, remembrances, associations, fears, joys, hopes and dreams.

His sculpture work has been made of marble, silver, gold, bronze and stainless steel, but it is usually silver-toned. These often contain elements such as birds, angels, archangels, winged victories, flames, and musical instruments. His metal sculptures evoke movement and harmony usually through the use of spirals.
