= Vigo County Public Library =

- 39.4640°N 87.4076°W
- Location: Terre Haute, IN, United States
- Type: Public library
- Established: 1882
- Branches: 3

Access and use
- Circulation: 482,969 (2025)

Other information
- Budget: $10,779,073 (2026)
- Director: Jordan Orwig
- Website: www.vigolibrary.org

The Vigo County Public Library is a funded public library that serves the people living in Terre Haute and other communities in Vigo County, Indiana. It has been in operation since 1882, when the existing library was purchased by local school trustees from the Terre Haute Library Association. Prior to this, there were multiple libraries in the Terre Haute area that were operated by various townships and private organizations. When a state law in 1881 connected the establishment of free public libraries to common schools in cities with more than ten thousand residents, the Terre Haute Board of School Trustees organized the library in its current form. In 1906, the library was moved to a new building and named the Emeline Fairbanks Memorial Library. A West Branch of the library was opened in 1961. The current main branch held its grand opening in 1979. In 2024, a branch in the area of 12 Points was opened in a renovated funeral home.

Free cards are available to those who live, own property, or go to school or college in Vigo County. In addition to a wide-ranging collection of books, newspapers, and magazines, materials for local history and genealogy, reference help, public computers, children's story times, and other typical public library services, the library offers interlibrary loan and downloadable audiobooks, eBooks, videos, and music. The library also hosts meetings with state senators and representatives during the legislative session, political debates during election seasons, and other similar community meetings.
