= Tecumseh (disambiguation) =

Tecumseh was a notable leader of an alliance of Native American tribes.

Tecumseh may also refer to:

== People ==
- Napoleon Jackson Tecumseh Dana (1822–1905), U.S. Army general in the American Civil War
- William Tecumseh Sherman (1820–1891), American Civil War General
- W. Tecumseh Fitch

== Places ==
=== Canada ===
- Mount Tecumseh (Alberta)
- New Tecumseth, Ontario
- Tecumseh, Ontario
- Rural Municipality of Tecumseh No. 65, Saskatchewan

=== United States ===
- Tecumseh, Indiana
- Tecumseh, Tippecanoe County, Indiana
- Tecumseh, Kansas
- Tecumseh, Michigan
- Tecumseh, Missouri
- Tecumseh, Nebraska
- Tecumseh, Oklahoma
- Tecumseh Township, Michigan
- Mount Tecumseh, in the White Mountains of New Hampshire

== Ships ==
- USS Tecumseh (1863), a US Civil War monitor warship type
- USS Tecumseh (SSBN-628), a ballistic missile submarine
- HMCS Tecumseh, a Canadian Naval Reserve Division
- Tecumseh (lake freighter), a bulk carrier
- CSL Tecumseh, a self-unloading Panamax bulk carrier

== Companies ==
- Tecumseh Products, a manufacturer of hermetic compressors for air conditioning and refrigeration products

== Schools ==
- Lafayette Tecumseh Junior High School in Lafayette, Indiana
- Tecumseh Elementary School in Vancouver, Canada
- Tecumseh High School (New Carlisle, Ohio)
- Tecumseh Junior – Senior High School in Lynnville, Indiana

== Other uses ==
- Tecumseh (film), a 1972 film
- Tecumseh (horse)
- Tecumseh Soccer Club, a women's semi-professional soccer team in League1 Ontario

== See also ==
- Tecumseh's Confederacy
- Tecumseh's Curse
- Tecumseh's War
