= Harrison Township, Vigo County, Indiana =

Harrison Township
- Township
- Seal
- Motto: "Together We Take Pride"
- Location in Vigo County
- Coordinates: 39°28′32″N 87°23′19″W
- Country: United States
- State: Indiana
- County: Vigo

Government
  - Type: Indiana township
  - Trustee: Stacee Todd

Area
  - Total: 23.54 sq mi (61.0 km^{2})
  - Land: 23.03 sq mi (59.6 km^{2})
  - Water: 0.51 sq mi (1.3 km^{2}) 2.17%
- Elevation: 489 ft (149 m)

Population (2020)
  - Total: 48,920
  - Density: 2,226.4/sq mi (859.6/km^{2})
- Time zone: UTC-5 (Eastern (EST))
  - Summer (DST): UTC-4 (EDT)
- ZIP codes: 47802, 47803, 47804, 47805, 47807
- GNIS feature ID: 453398
- Website: harrisontwptrustee.com

Harrison Township is one of twelve townships in Vigo County, Indiana, United States. As of the 2020 census, its population was 48,920. It is entirely contained in Terre Haute's city limits, thus explaining why it is both the most densely populated and the most populated overall.

== Geography ==
According to the 2010 census, the township has a total area of 23.54 square miles (61.0 km^{2}), of which 23.03 square miles (59.6 km^{2}) (or 97.83%) is land and 0.51 square miles (1.3 km^{2}) (or 2.17%) is water.

=== Cities and towns ===
- Terre Haute

=== Unincorporated communities ===
- Deming Park
- Dewey
- Duane Yards
- Parkview
- Preston
- Terre Town
- Twelve Points

=== Boundaries ===
The boundaries consist of the following streets or features:

- North border: Haythorne Avenue
- West border: Wabash River
- South border: Margaret Avenue
- East border: .5 miles east of Fruitridge Street

=== Adjacent townships ===
- Otter Creek Township (northeast)
- Lost Creek Township (east)
- Riley Township (southeast)
- Honey Creek Township (south)
- Sugar Creek Township (west)
- Fayette Township (northwest)
- Prairie Township (southwest)

=== Cemeteries ===
The township contains these four cemeteries: Calvary, Grandview, Rogers and New Harmony.

=== Lakes ===
- Crystal Lake

== Demographics ==
As of the census of 2000, there were 51,898 people and 20,618 households residing in the township. The population density was 2,262/mi^{2}. The racial makeup of the township was 86.8% White, 9.3% Black or African American, 0.3% Native American, 1.0% Asian, less than 0.1% Pacific Islander, 0.5% from other races, and 2.0% from two or more races. 1.2% of the population were Hispanic or Latino of any race.

The average household size was 2.29 and the average family size was 2.96. The median age was 31.6 years. For every 100 females, there were 89 males.

The median income for a household in the township was $26,705, and the median income for a family was $35,135. The per capita income for the township was $14,540. 20.6% of the population and 16.4% of families were below the poverty line.

== School districts ==
This township is served by the Vigo County School Corporation. Several schools are located in this township:

- One high school - Terre Haute North
- Two middle schools - Sarah Scott and Woodrow Wilson (A third school, named Chauncey Rose was closed)
- Ten elementary schools - Benjamin Franklin, Davis Park, Deming, DeVaney, Farrington Grove, Fuqua, Meadows, Ouabache, Sugar Grove, Terre Town

== Political districts ==
- Indiana's 8th congressional district
- State House District 43
- State House District 46
- State Senate District 38
