= List of memorials to Tecumseh =

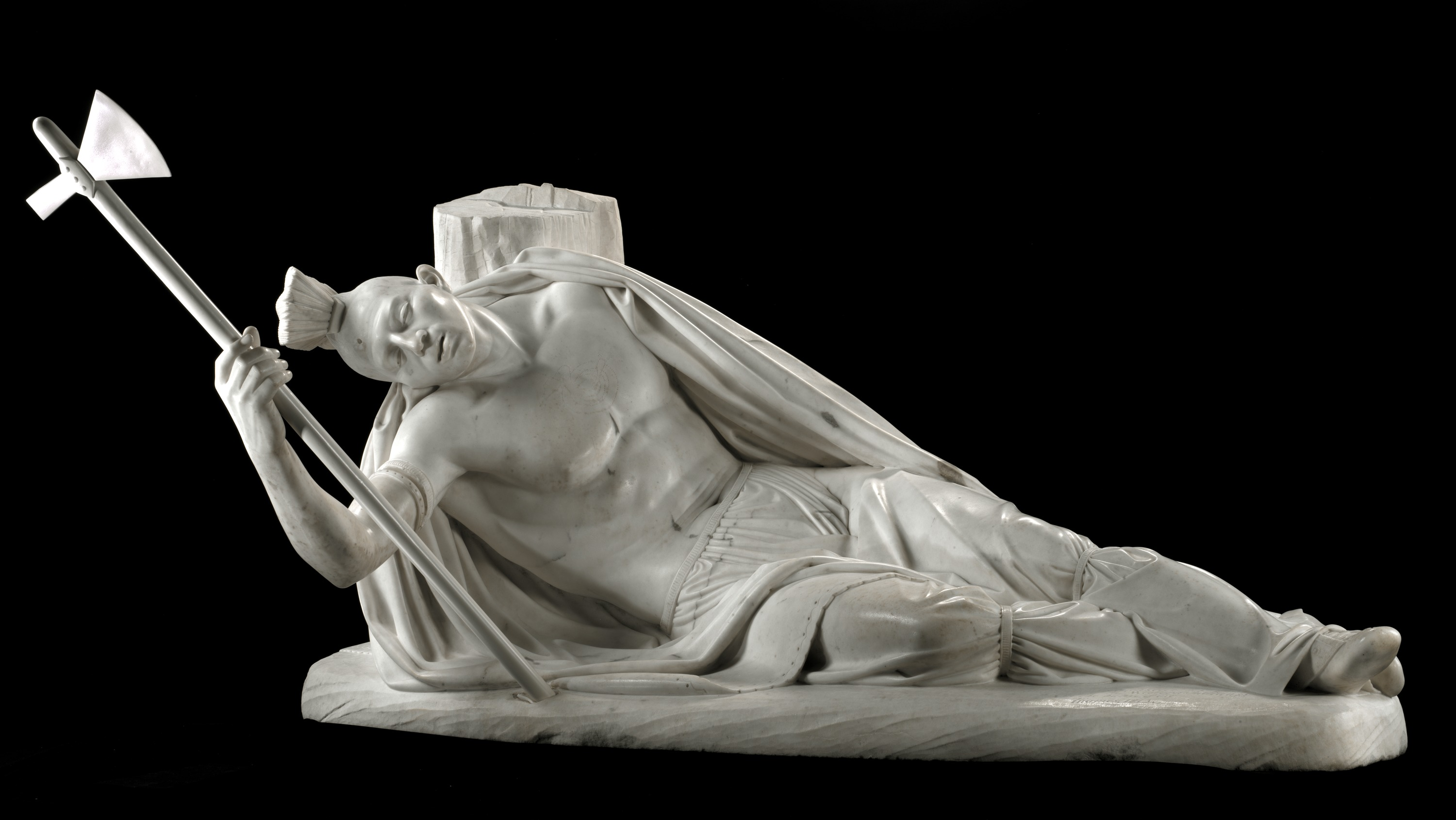
Pettrich, The Dying Tecumseh

This is a list of memorials to Tecumseh (c. 1768 – October 5, 1813), the Shawnee leader who was killed in the War of 1812 and became an iconic folk hero in American, Indigenous, and Canadian history.

== Canada ==
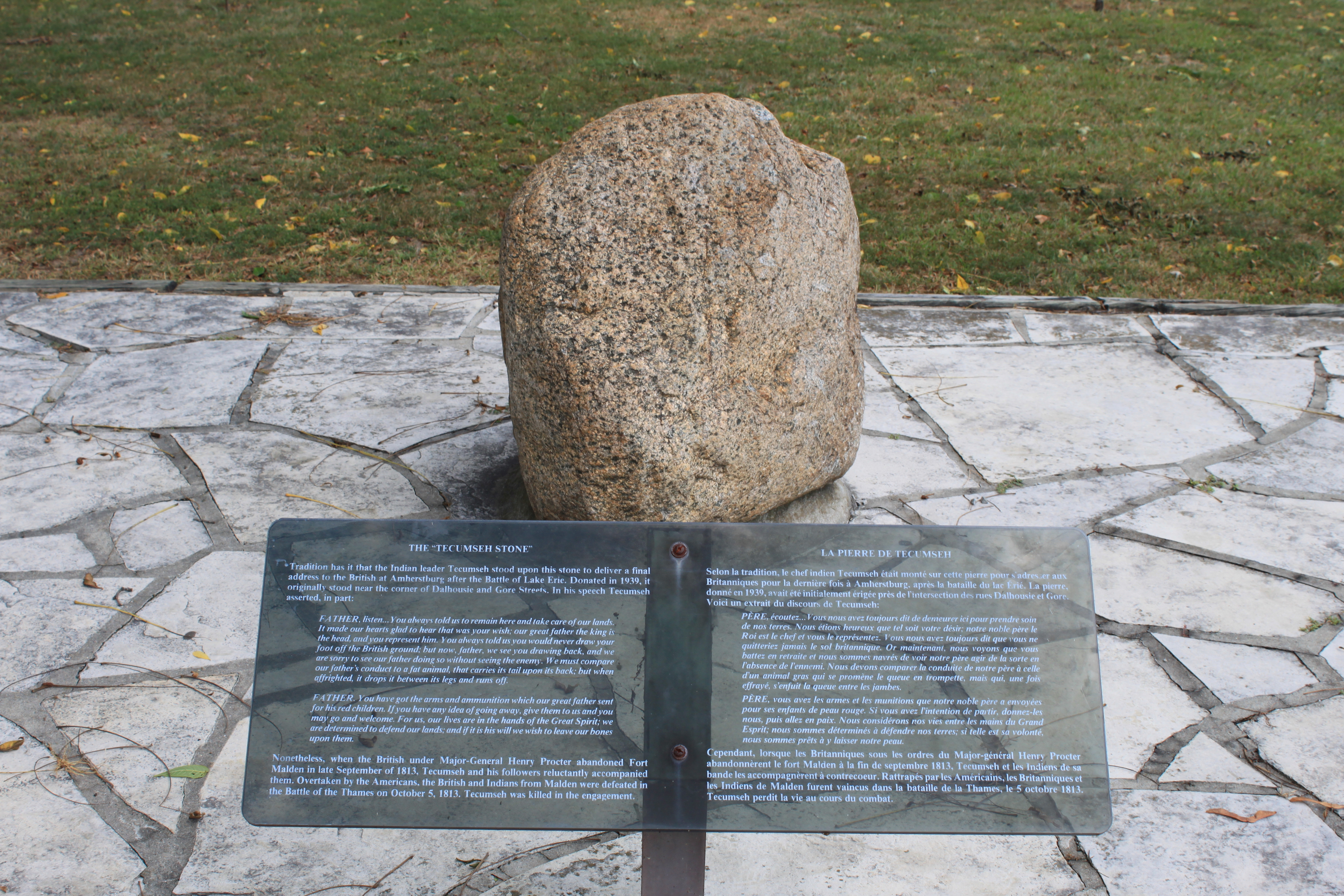
"Tecumseh Stone", Fort Malden National Historic Site

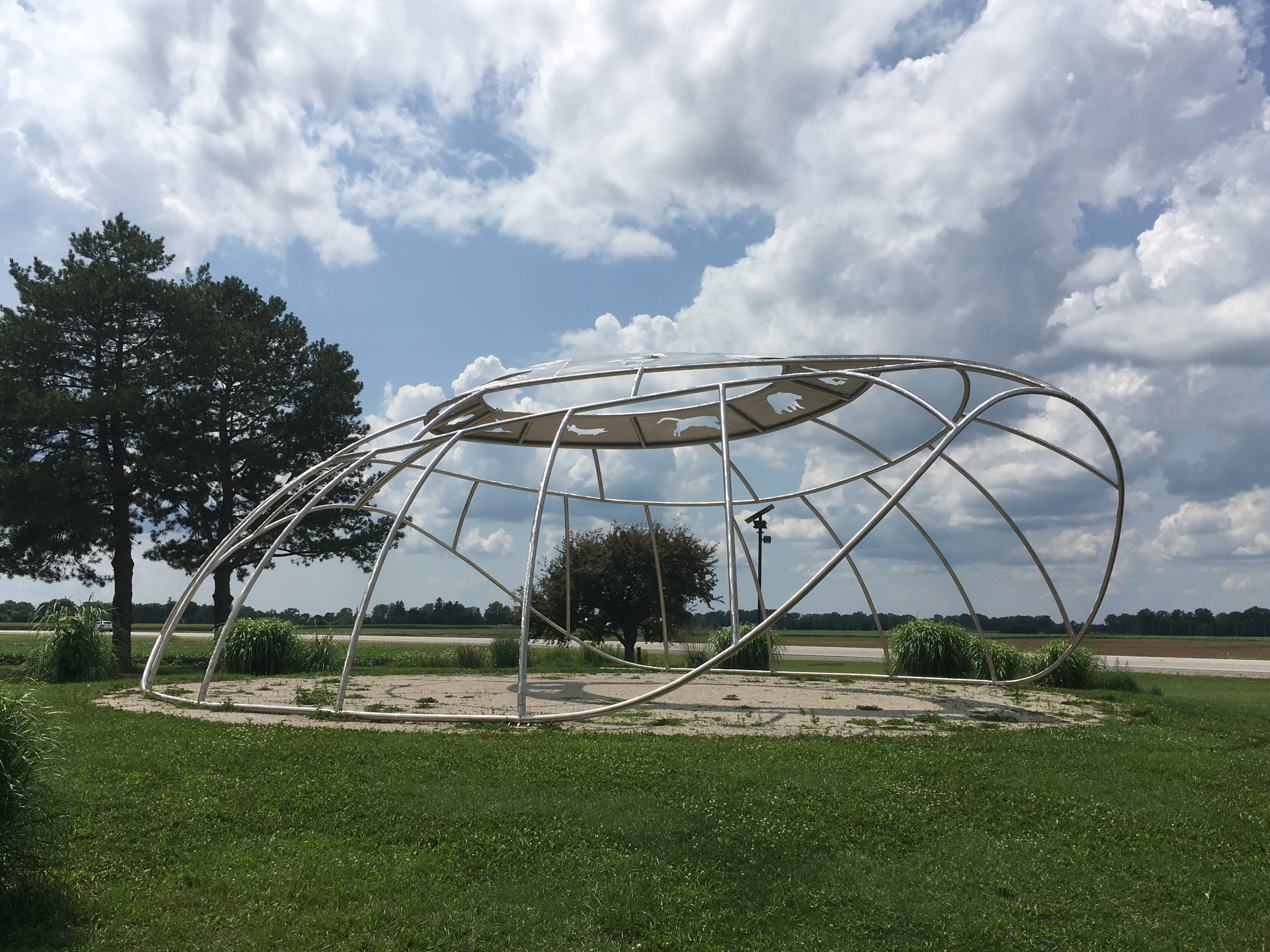
Turtle-shell Tecumseh Monument at the site of the Battle of the Thames

Tecumseh is honored in Canada as a hero and military commander who played a major role in Canada's successful repulsion of an American invasion in the War of 1812, which, among other things, eventually led to Canada's nationhood in 1867 with the British North America Act. Among the tributes, Tecumseh is ranked 37th in The Greatest Canadian list. The Canadian naval reserve unit HMCS Tecumseh is based in Calgary, Alberta. The Royal Canadian Mint released a two dollar coin on June 18, 2012 and will release four quarters, celebrating the Bicentennial of the War of 1812. The second quarter in the series, was released in November 2012 and features Tecumseh.

The Ontario Heritage Foundation & Kent Military Reenactment Society erected a plaque in Tecumseh Park, 50 William Street North, Chatham, Ontario, reading: "On this site, Tecumseh, a Shawnee Chief, who was an ally of the British during the war of 1812, fought against American forces on October 4, 1813. Tecumseh was born in 1768 and became an important organizer of native resistance to the spread of white settlement in North America. The day after the fighting here, he was killed in the Battle of the Thames near Moraviantown. Tecumseh park was named to commemorate strong will and determination."

He is also honored by a massive portrait which hangs in the Royal Canadian Military Institute. The unveiling of the work by Gertrude Steiger Kearns CM, commissioned under the patronage of Kathryn Langley Hope and Trisha Langley, took place at the Toronto-based RCMI on October 29, 2008.

A replica of the War of 1812 warship HMS Tecumseh was built in 1994 and displayed in Penetanguishene, Ontario, near the raised wreck of the original HMS Tecumseh. The original HMS Tecumseh was built in 1815 to be used in defense against the Americans. First on Lake Erie, she moved to Lake Huron in 1817. She sank in Penetanguishene harbor in 1828, and was raised in 1953.

Mount Tecumseh in the Canadian Rockies of southern Alberta is officially named in his honor.

== U.S. military ==
Four ships of the United States Navy have been named USS Tecumseh.

- The first USS Tecumseh (1863) was a Canonicus-class monitor, commissioned on April 19, 1864. It was lost with almost all hands on August 5, at the Battle of Mobile Bay.
- The second USS Tecumseh (YT-24) was a tugboat, originally named Edward Luckenbach, purchased by the Navy in 1898 and renamed. She served off and on until she was struck from the Navy list c. 1945.
- The third USS Tecumseh (YT-273) was a Pessacus-class tugboat, commissioned in 1943 and struck from service in 1975.
- The fourth USS Tecumseh (SSBN-628) was a James Madison-class ballistic missile submarine, commissioned in 1964 and struck in 1993.

== Places ==
A number of towns have been named in honor of Tecumseh, including those in the states of Indiana (Vigo County and Tippecanoe County), Kansas, Michigan, Missouri, Nebraska, Oklahoma, and the province of Ontario, as well as the town and township of New Tecumseth, Ontario. Mount Tecumseh in New Hampshire is also named after Tecumseh.

Great Council State Park in the Oldtown area of Xenia Township, Greene County, Ohio, being developed in Tecumseh's honor, is scheduled to open in 2023.

== School names ==
Schools named in honor of Tecumseh include, in the United States:

- Tecumseh Junior – Senior High in Hart Township, Warrick County, just outside Lynnville, Indiana.
- Lafayette Tecumseh Junior High in Lafayette, Indiana. Tecumseh-Harrison Elementary in Vincennes, Indiana.
- Tecumseh Acres Elementary, Tecumseh Middle and Tecumseh High in Tecumseh, Michigan.
- Tecumseh Elementary in Farmingville, New York.
- Tecumseh Elementary in Jamesville, New York.
- Tecumseh Middle and Tecumseh High in Bethel Township, Clark County near New Carlisle, Ohio and their district, the Tecumseh Local School District.
- Tecumseh Elementary in Xenia Township, Greene County near Xenia, Ohio.
- Tecumseh Middle and Tecumseh High in Tecumseh, Oklahoma.

And in Canada:

- Tecumseh Elementary in Vancouver.
- Tecumseh Public in Burlington, Ontario.
- Tecumseh Public School in Chatham, Ontario.
- Tecumseh Public School in London, Ontario.
- Tecumseh Senior Public in Scarborough, Ontario.

== Sculptures ==
In Canada, the Royal Ontario Museum exhibits a bust of Tecumseh created by Hamilton MacCarthy in 1896.

A life-size equestrian statue of Tecumseh along with a dismounted figure of British Major General Sir Isaac Brock, both created by Canadian sculptor Mark Williams, was unveiled in Sandwich Towne, a neighborhood in Windsor, Ontario, on September 7, 2018. David Morris, who frequently portrayed Tecumseh during War of 1812 bicentennial events, was the model for Tecumseh.

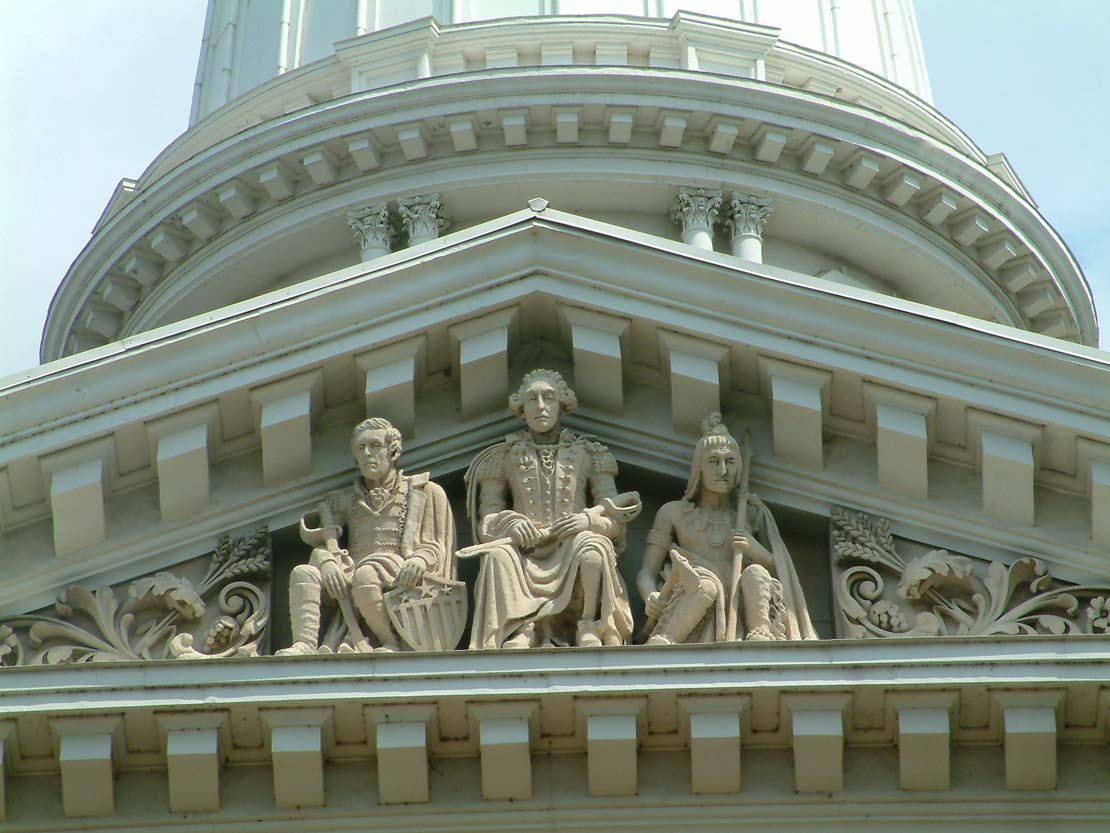
Tecumseh (right) in the Tippecanoe County Courthouse pediment

German sculptor Ferdinand Pettrich (1798–1872) studied under the neo-classicist Danish sculptor Bertel Thorvaldsen in Rome and moved to the United States in 1835. He was especially impressed by the Indians. He modelled The Dying Tecumseh ca. 1837–1846; it was finished 1856 in marble and copper alloy. The sculpture was put on display in the U.S. Capitol, where a stereoscopic photograph was taken of it in the later 1860s; in 1916 it was transferred to the Smithsonian American Art Museum.

In recent years, Peter Wolf Toth has created the Trail of the Whispering Giants, a series of sculptures honoring Native Americans. He donated one work devoted to Tecumseh to the City of Vincennes, which was Indiana's territorial capital in the years around 1810, where Tecumseh confronted governor William Henry Harrison, and in the area of which Tecumseh's war then happened and the War of 1812 started. In Lafayette, Indiana, Tecumseh appears along with the Marquis de Lafayette and Harrison in a pediment on the Tippecanoe County Courthouse (1882).

Just west of Portsmouth, Ohio, there is a wood carving of the aged Tecumseh in Shawnee State Park's Shawnee Lodge and Conference Center.

== Paintings ==
A portrait of Tecumseh was commissioned to commemorate the 250th year of his birth. Using an 1808 "pencil sketch", a detailed War of 1812 eyewitness description, Shawnee photos, imaging software and 70 years of illustration experience, Eleanor Rindlisbacher of Tecumseh, Ontario, has recreated Tecumseh. This new image was authenticated by superimposing an 1830 "from life" painting by Charles Bird King of Tecumseh’s brother, Tenskwatawa and thus reasonable similarities were observed.

== Names of people ==
Union Civil War general William Tecumseh Sherman was given the middle name of Tecumseh because "my father ... had caught a fancy for the great chief of the Shawnees". Another Civil War general, Napoleon Jackson Tecumseh Dana, also bore the name of the Shawnee leader.
