= Fayette Township, Vigo County, Indiana =

Fayette Township
- Township
- Location in Vigo County
- Coordinates: 39°33′36″N 87°27′55″W
- Country: United States
- State: Indiana
- County: Vigo

Government
  - Type: Indiana township
  - Trustee: Paul Allsup

Area
  - Total: 40.61 sq mi (105.2 km^{2})
  - Land: 40 sq mi (100 km^{2})
  - Water: 0.62 sq mi (1.6 km^{2}) 1.53%
- Elevation: 630 ft (192 m)

Population (2020)
  - Total: 2,721
  - Density: 65.8/sq mi (25.4/km^{2})
- Time zone: UTC-5 (Eastern (EST))
  - Summer (DST): UTC-4 (EDT)
- ZIP codes: 47842, 47863, 47885
- GNIS feature ID: 453293
- Website: fayettetwptrustee.com

Fayette Township is one of twelve townships in Vigo County, Indiana, United States. As of the 2020 census, its population was 2,731.

== Geography ==
According to the 2010 census, the township has a total area of 40.61 square miles (105.2 km^{2}), of which 40 square miles (100 km^{2}) (or 98.50%) is land and 0.62 square miles (1.6 km^{2}) (or 1.53%) is water.

=== Adjacent townships ===
- Clinton Township, Vermillion County (north)
- Florida Township, Parke County (northeast)
- Otter Creek Township (east)
- Harrison Township (southeast)
- Sugar Creek Township (south)
- Elbridge Township, Edgar County, Illinois (west)
- Stratton Township, Edgar County, Illinois (west)

=== Unincorporated communities ===
- Shepardsville
- Libertyville
- New Goshen
- Pine Ridge
- Sandford
- Shephardsville
- Shirkieville
- Tecumseh
- West New Goshen

=== Cemeteries ===
The township contains these two cemeteries: Barbour and Pleasantview.

=== Rivers ===
- Wabash River

== School districts ==
- Vigo County School Corporation

== Political districts ==
- Indiana's 8th congressional district
- State House District 42
- State Senate District 38
