= Massies Creek =

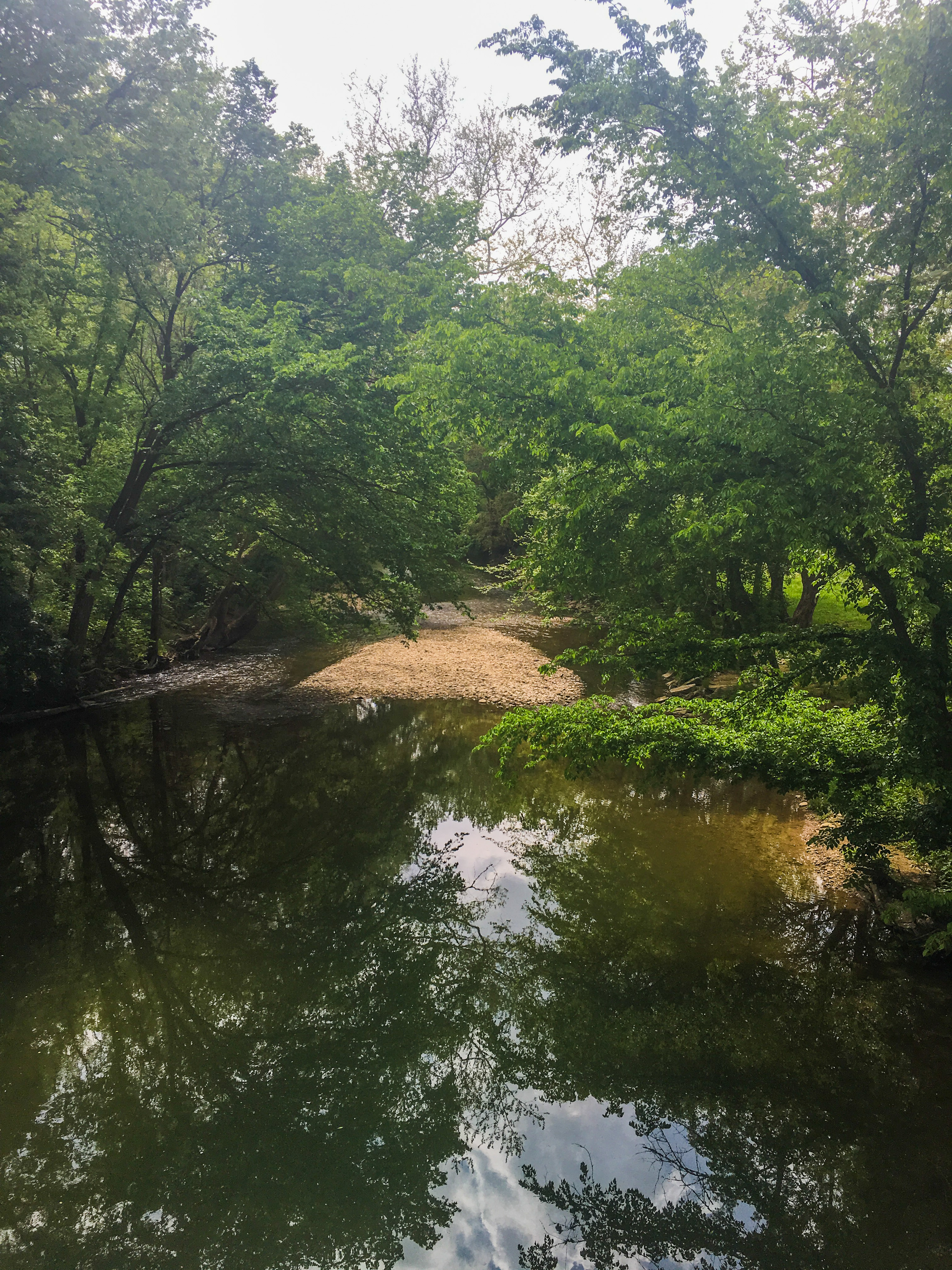
Massies Creek as seen from the Little Miami Scenic Trail, May 2018

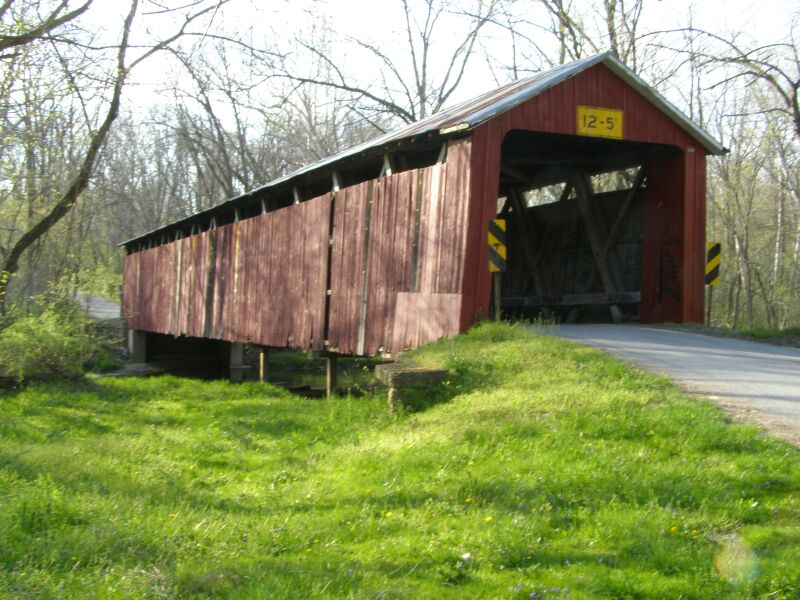
The Charleton Mill Road Covered Bridge spans Massies Creek north of Wilberforce

Massies Creek is a stream located entirely within Greene County, Ohio. It is a tributary of the Little Miami River.

The stream begins at the confluence of the North and South forks within Cedarville at 39°44′34″N 83°48′19″W and flows generally west to enter the Little Miami north of Oldtown and Xenia at 39°44′11″N 83°56′25″W.

Massies Creek was named for Nathaniel Massie, a government surveyor. Variant names include Masseys Creek, Massicks Creek and Massie Creek.

== See also ==
- List of rivers of Ohio
