= Shepardsville, Indiana =

- Census-designated place
- Location of Shepardsville in Vigo County, Indiana.
- Coordinates: 39°36′06″N 87°25′35″W
- Country: United States
- State: Indiana
- County: Vigo
- Township: Fayette

Area
  - Total: 0.92 sq mi (2.39 km^{2})
  - Land: 0.92 sq mi (2.38 km^{2})
  - Water: 0.0039 sq mi (0.01 km^{2})
- Elevation: 548 ft (167 m)

Population (2020)
  - Total: 219
  - Density: 238.2/sq mi (91.98/km^{2})
- Time zone: UTC-5 (EST)
  - Summer (DST): UTC-4 (EDT)
- ZIP code: 47880
- Area codes: 812, 930
- GNIS feature ID: 2631345

Shepardsville is an unincorporated census-designated place in northeastern Fayette Township, Vigo County, in the U.S. state of Indiana. It lies along Trinity Ave. north of the city of Terre Haute, the county seat of Vigo County. Although Shepardsville is unincorporated, it has a post office, with the ZIP code of 47880. As of the 2020 census, Shepardsville had a population of 219.

The communities is part of the Terre Haute metropolitan area.

== History ==
Shepardsville was founded in 1920. The post office at Shepardsville has been in operation since 1937.

== Fire Protection ==
Fire protection for the community of Shepardsville is handled by the Shepardsville Fire Department. est 1957

== Demographics ==
Historical population
Census	Pop.	Note	%±
2020	219		—
U.S. Decennial Census

== Education ==
All areas in Vigo County are in the Vigo County School Corporation. Shepardsville is zoned to New Goshen is zoned to Fayette Elementary School, West Vigo Middle School and West Vigo High School. West Vigo Middle School, and West Vigo High School.
