= New Goshen, Indiana =

- Census-designated place
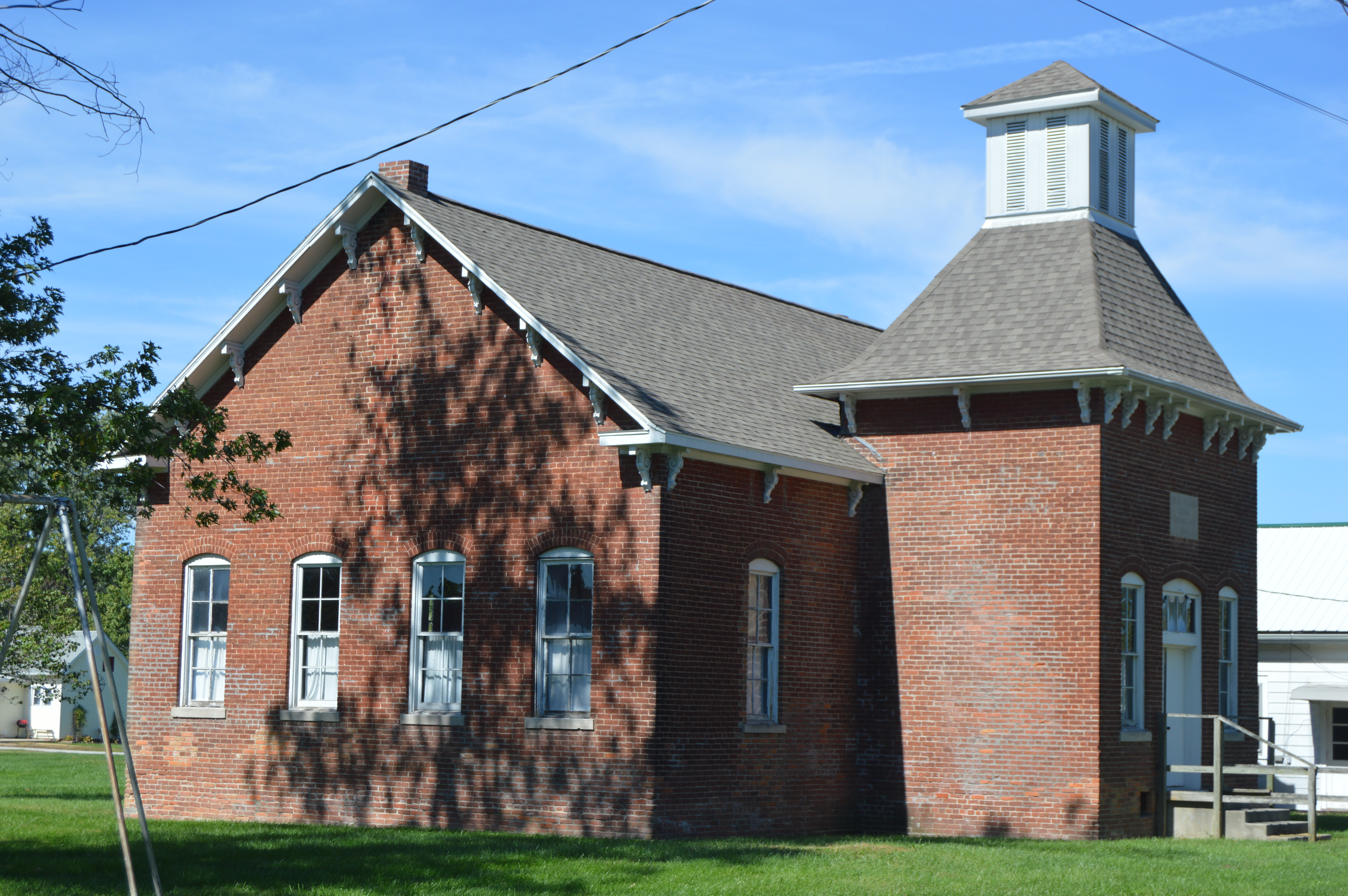
- Former school on Rangeline Place

- Location of New Goshen in Vigo County, Indiana.
- Coordinates: 39°34′51″N 87°27′39″W
- Country: United States
- State: Indiana
- County: Vigo
- Township: Fayette

Area
  - Total: 3.34 sq mi (8.64 km^{2})
  - Land: 3.31 sq mi (8.57 km^{2})
  - Water: 0.027 sq mi (0.07 km^{2})
- Elevation: 640 ft (200 m)

Population (2020)
  - Total: 402
  - Density: 121.4/sq mi (46.89/km^{2})
- Time zone: UTC-5 (Eastern (EST))
  - Summer (DST): UTC-4 (EDT)
- ZIP code: 47863
- Area codes: 812, 930
- FIPS code: 18-52956
- GNIS feature ID: 2583461

New Goshen is a census-designated place (CDP) in Fayette Township, Vigo County, in the U.S. state of Indiana. It is part of the Terre Haute Metropolitan Statistical Area.

As of the 2020 census, New Goshen had a population of 402.

== History ==
New Goshen was platted and laid out May 17, 1853, by Hamilton Smith, William Ferguson, George Smith and John Hay. As of 1890 the population was approximately 180. Future U.S. Senator Birch Bayh was a resident and graduated from Fayette High; Fayette High closed in 1959 and was consolidated into today's West Vigo High School.

The post office at New Goshen has been in operation since 1851.

== Geography ==
It is bisected by U.S. Route 150, which connects it to Paris, Illinois, to the northwest and West Terre Haute, Indiana, to the southwest.

== Demographics ==
Historical population
Census	Pop.	Note	%±
2020	402		—
U.S. Decennial Census

== Education ==
All areas in Vigo County are in the Vigo County School Corporation. New Goshen is zoned to Fayette Elementary School, West Vigo Middle School, and West Vigo High School.
