= Parkview, Indiana =

- Unincorporated community
- Vigo County's location in Indiana

- location in Vigo County, Indiana
- Coordinates: 39°30′59″N 87°23′31″W
- Country: United States
- State: Indiana
- County: Vigo
- Township: Harrison
- Elevation: 515 ft (157 m)
- Time zone: UTC-5 (Eastern (EST))
  - Summer (DST): UTC-4 (EDT)
- ZIP code: 47805
- Area codes: 812, 930
- GNIS feature ID: 440899

Parkview is an unincorporated community in northern Harrison Township, Vigo County, in the U.S. state of Indiana.

Now within the boundaries of the city of Terre Haute, it is also part of the Terre Haute metropolitan area.

== Geography ==
Parkview is located at 39°30′59″N 87°23′31″W at an elevation of 515 feet.
