= Pine Ridge, Indiana =

- Unincorporated community
- Vigo County's location in Indiana

- location in Vigo County, Indiana
- Coordinates: 39°34′45″N 87°29′30″W
- Country: United States
- State: Indiana
- County: Vigo
- Township: Fayette
- Elevation: 614 ft (187 m)
- Time zone: UTC-5 (Eastern (EST))
  - Summer (DST): UTC-4 (EDT)
- ZIP code: 47885
- Area codes: 812, 930
- GNIS feature ID: 446683

Pine Ridge is an unincorporated community in Fayette Township, Vigo County, in the U.S. state of Indiana. It is part of the Terre Haute metropolitan area.

The Pine Ridge Mine Pond reservoir is located in Pine Ridge.

== Geography ==
Pine Ridge is located at 39°34′45″N 87°29′30″W at an elevation of 614 feet.
