= Cedarville, Ohio =

- Village
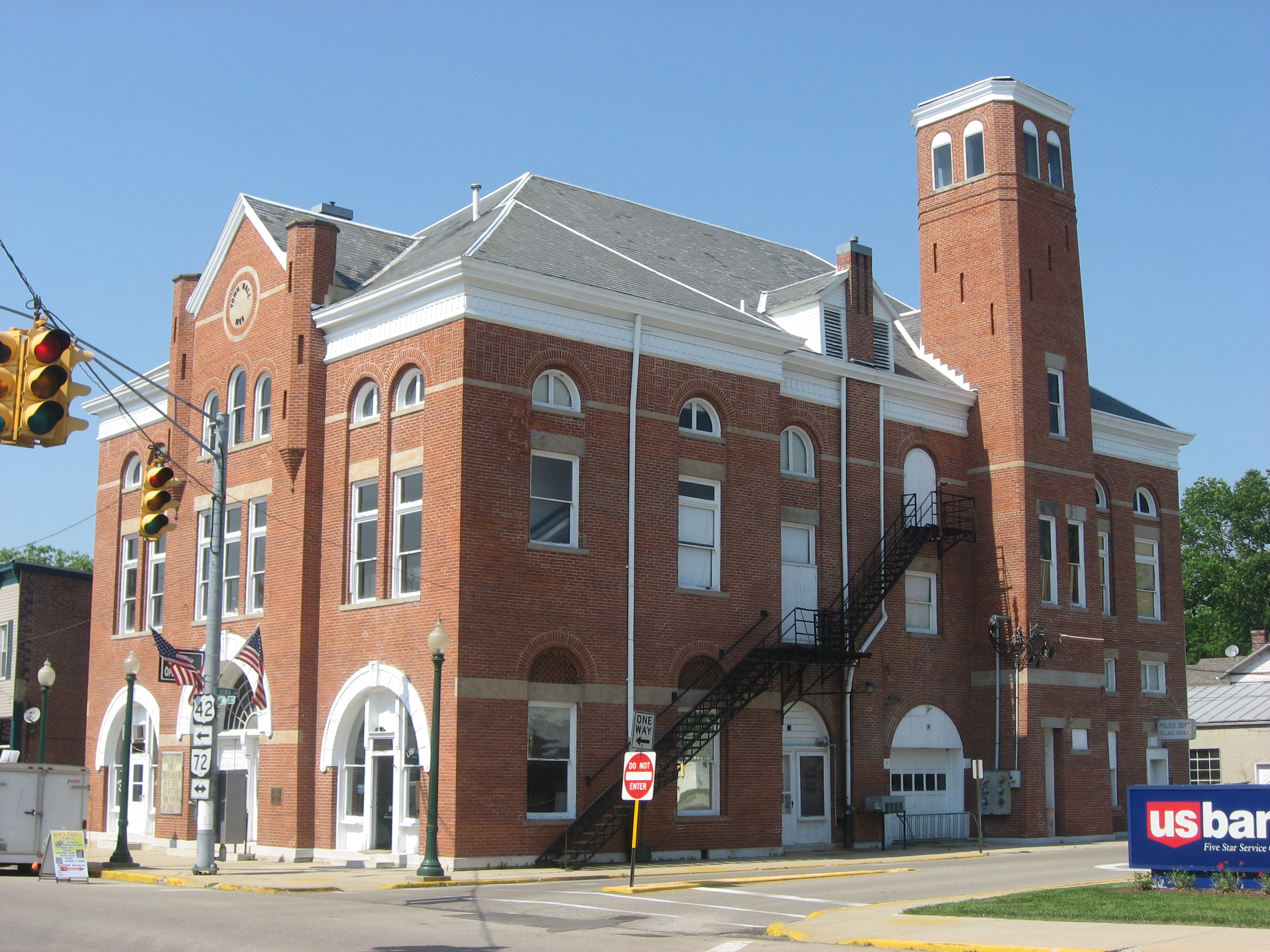
- Cedarville's historic opera house

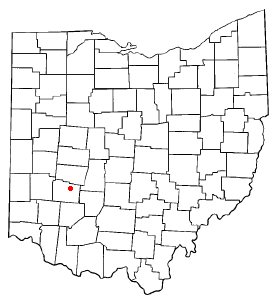
- Location of Cedarville, Ohio

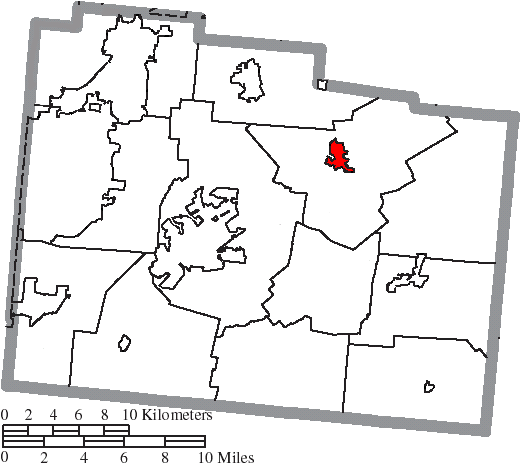
- Location of Cedarville in Greene County
- Coordinates: 39°45′05″N 83°48′40″W
- Country: United States
- State: Ohio
- County: Greene

Government
  - Mayor: John Cody Jr.

Area
  - Total: 1.36 sq mi (3.51 km^{2})
  - Land: 1.31 sq mi (3.39 km^{2})
  - Water: 0.046 sq mi (0.12 km^{2})
- Elevation: 1,047 ft (319 m)

Population (2020)
  - Total: 4,257
  - Estimate (2023): 4,250
  - Density: 3,252.5/sq mi (1,255.79/km^{2})
- Time zone: UTC-5 (Eastern (EST))
  - Summer (DST): UTC-4 (EDT)
- ZIP code: 45314
- Area codes: 937, 326
- FIPS code: 39-12784
- GNIS feature ID: 2397584
- Website: cedarville.us

Cedarville is a village in Greene County, Ohio, United States. The village is within the Dayton Metropolitan Statistical Area. The population was 4,257 at the 2020 census. The community is home to Cedarville University.

== History ==
Cedarville was settled by Irish and Scottish immigrants in 1799. Cedarville was originally known as Milford, and under the latter name was platted in 1816. This was because of postal confusion with the city of Milford, Ohio. A post office called Massies Creek was established in 1837, and the name was changed to Cedarville in 1843. The present name is for cedar trees near the original town site.

For many years beginning in the 1880s, public life in Cedarville centered around the downtown Cedarville Opera House; it survives to the present day, and is listed on the National Register of Historic Places.

== Geography ==
According to the United States Census Bureau, the village has a total area of 1.32 square miles (3.42 km^{2}), of which 1.28 square miles (3.32 km^{2}) is land and 0.04 square miles (0.10 km^{2}) is water.

== Demographics ==
Historical population
Census	Pop.	Note	%±
1860	688		—
1870	753		9.4%
1880	1,181		56.8%
1890	1,355		14.7%
1900	1,189		−12.3%
1910	1,059		−10.9%
1920	1,028		−2.9%
1930	940		−8.6%
1940	1,034		10.0%
1950	1,292		25.0%
1960	1,702		31.7%
1970	2,342		37.6%
1980	2,799		19.5%
1990	3,210		14.7%
2000	3,828		19.3%
2010	4,019		5.0%
2020	4,257		5.9%
2023 (est.)	4,250	▼	−0.2%
U.S. Decennial Census

=== 2020 census ===
As of the 2020 census, Cedarville had a population of 4,257. The median age was 20.8 years. 8.2% of residents were under the age of 18 and 5.9% of residents were 65 years of age or older. For every 100 females there were 84.7 males, and for every 100 females age 18 and over there were 84.8 males age 18 and over.

0.0% of residents lived in urban areas, while 100.0% lived in rural areas.

There were 670 households in Cedarville, of which 25.1% had children under the age of 18 living in them. Of all households, 44.3% were married-couple households, 21.8% were households with a male householder and no spouse or partner present, and 32.8% were households with a female householder and no spouse or partner present. About 33.9% of all households were made up of individuals and 13.0% had someone living alone who was 65 years of age or older.

There were 788 housing units, of which 15.0% were vacant. The homeowner vacancy rate was 0.9% and the rental vacancy rate was 12.0%.

Racial composition as of the 2020 census
Race	Number	Percent
White	3,791	89.1%
Black or African American	104	2.4%
American Indian and Alaska Native	3	0.1%
Asian	122	2.9%
Native Hawaiian and Other Pacific Islander	0	0.0%
Some other race	48	1.1%
Two or more races	189	4.4%
Hispanic or Latino (of any race)	65	1.5%

=== 2010 census ===
As of the census of 2010, there were 4,019 people, 686 households, and 411 families living in the village. The population density was 3,139.8 inhabitants per square mile (1,212.3/km^{2}). There were 759 housing units at an average density of 593.0 per square mile (229.0/km^{2}). The racial makeup of the village was 94.4% White, 2.3% African American, 0.1% Native American, 1.1% Asian, 0.3% from other races, and 1.7% from two or more races. Hispanic or Latino of any race were 2.2% of the population.

There were 686 households, of which 26.5% had children under the age of 18 living with them, 47.7% were married couples living together, 9.3% had a female householder with no husband present, 2.9% had a male householder with no wife present, and 40.1% were non-families. 28.4% of all households were made up of individuals, and 12.3% had someone living alone who was 65 years of age or older. The average household size was 2.45 and the average family size was 2.96.

The median age in the village was 21 years. 9.2% of residents were under the age of 18; 66.4% were between the ages of 18 and 24; 8.4% were from 25 to 44; 9.8% were from 45 to 64; and 6% were 65 years of age or older. The gender makeup of the village was 46.5% male and 53.5% female.

=== 2000 census ===
As of the census of 2000, there were 3,828 people, 681 households, and 420 families living in the village. The population density was 3,594.6 inhabitants per square mile (1,387.9/km^{2}). There were 722 housing units at an average density of 678.0 per square mile (261.8/km^{2}). The racial makeup of the village was 95.06% White, 1.99% African American, 0.39% Native American, 0.81% Asian, 0.03% Pacific Islander, 0.31% from other races, and 1.41% from two or more races. Hispanic or Latino of any race were 0.94% of the population.

There were 681 households, out of which 28.8% had children under the age of 18 living with them, 51.2% were married couples living together, 7.6% had a female householder with no husband present, and 38.2% were non-families. 26.1% of all households were made up of individuals, and 9.1% had someone living alone who was 65 years of age or older. The average household size was 2.55 and the average family size was 3.08.

The village's population primarily consists of college-age students, with 10.4% of residents being under the age of 18, 65.0% from 18 to 24, 10.7% from 25 to 44, 8.4% from 45 to 64, and 5.5% who were 65 years of age or older. The median age was 21 years. For every 100 females there were 85.9 males. For every 100 females age 18 and over, there were 83.8 males.

The median income for a household in the village was $37,200, and the median income for a family was $44,234. Males had a median income of $32,500 versus $22,813 for females. The per capita income for the village was $9,499. About 5.4% of families and 13.8% of the population were below the poverty line, including 5.6% of those under age 18 and 4.3% of those age 65 or over.

== Culture ==
=== CedarFest ===
To celebrate its distinction as the birthplace of James H. Kyle, Cedarville commemorates Labor Day with CedarFest, an annual festival. The weekend is capped by a fireworks display on the Sunday before Labor Day in Cedar Park.

=== Little Town of Lights ===
The Little Town of Lights is held annually on the first weekend of December. Residents coordinate their outdoor lighted decorations (traditionally empty gallon milk jugs with a candle placed inside) and also compete for the best display.

== Education ==
Postcard of the village's Carnegie Library, currently in use by Cedarville University as a Fine Arts building

The Cedar Cliff Local School District operates three public schools combined in one building in the village: Cedarville Elementary School, Cedarville Middle School, and Cedarville High School, with a total of 616 students district wide. The Cedar Cliff Local School District gets its name from the two towns which it serves, Cedarville and Clifton.

Cedarville University, a Baptist institution, has been in operation at Cedarville since 1887.

Cedarville has a public library, a branch of the Greene County Public Library.

== Notable people ==
- David Jeremiah, evangelist
- Bumpus Jones, Major League Baseball player
- Mike Kellogg, radio evangelist
- James H. Kyle, politician, South Dakota senator, "Father" of Labor Day
- Eleanor Parker, actress
- Whitelaw Reid, newspaper publisher and statesman
