= West New Goshen, Indiana =

- Unincorporated community
- Vigo County's location in Indiana

- Location in Vigo County, Indiana
- Coordinates: 39°34′15″N 87°28′50″W
- Country: United States
- State: Indiana
- County: Vigo
- Township: Fayette
- Elevation: 617 ft (188 m)
- Time zone: UTC-5 (Eastern (EST))
  - Summer (DST): UTC-4 (EDT)
- ZIP code: 47885
- Area codes: 812, 930
- GNIS feature ID: 446684

West New Goshen is an unincorporated community in Fayette Township, Vigo County, in the U.S. state of Indiana.

The community is part of the Terre Haute Metropolitan Statistical Area.

== Geography ==
West New Goshen is located at 39°34′15″N 87°28′50″W.
