= Sandford, Indiana =

- Unincorporated community
- Vigo County's location in Indiana

- Location in Vigo County, Indiana
- Coordinates: 39°32′43″N 87°31′50″W
- Country: United States
- State: Indiana
- County: Vigo
- Township: Fayette
- Elevation: 630 ft (192 m)
- Time zone: UTC-5 (Eastern (EST))
  - Summer (DST): UTC-4 (EDT)
- ZIP code: 47885
- Area codes: 812, 930
- FIPS code: 18-67824
- GNIS feature ID: 442999

Sandford is an unincorporated community in Fayette Township, Vigo County, in the U.S. state of Indiana. The community is part of the Terre Haute Metropolitan Statistical Area. A small portion of Sandford, now known as West Sandford or “Stringtown”, is in Illinois.

== History ==
Sandford was established in 1854 at the state line between Illinois and Indiana. With the building of the Indianapolis & St. Louis Railroad, it became an important town in the area. In 1890 it had a population of approximately 250.

A post office was established at Sandford in 1855, and remained in operation until 1995.

On Jan. 19, 1907, at least 30 people were killed when nitroglycerin exploded in a freight car as a passenger train passed.

== Geography ==
Sandford is located at 39°32′43″N 87°31′50″W.
