= Shirkieville, Indiana =

- Unincorporated community
- Vigo County's location in Indiana

- Location in Vigo County, Indiana
- Coordinates: 39°36′01″N 87°29′55″W
- Country: United States
- State: Indiana
- County: Vigo
- Township: Fayette
- Elevation: 610 ft (186 m)
- Time zone: UTC-5 (Eastern (EST))
  - Summer (DST): UTC-4 (EDT)
- ZIP code: 47885
- Area codes: 812, 930
- GNIS feature ID: 443419

Shirkieville is an unincorporated community in Fayette Township, Vigo County, in the U.S. state of Indiana. The community is part of the Terre Haute Metropolitan Statistical Area. Former state governor and U.S. Senator Evan Bayh was born here.

== Geography ==
Shirkieville is located at 39°36′01″N 87°29′55″W.

== Notable people ==
- Evan Bayh, former Governor and U.S. Senator of Indiana, born in Shirkieville
- The community was named after Samuel Shirk. Samuel Shirk was an early settler in the area that would become Shirkieville, in Vigo County, Indiana. He likely played a role in the establishment and development of the community, contributing to the growth of the area through agriculture, trade, or local leadership.
