= Cedarville High School (Cedarville, Ohio) =

Public, coeducational high school in Cedarville, Ohio, United States

Location
- 194 Walnut St, Cedarville, OH; Cedarville, Ohio; Cedarville, (Greene County), Ohio 45314; United States
- Coordinates: 39°44′50″N 83°48′29″W

Information
- Type: Public, Coeducational high school
- Opened: 1900s
- School district: Cedar Cliff Local Schools
- Superintendent: Brian Masser
- Principal: Chad Haemmerle
- Grades: 9-12
- Colors: Red and White
- Fight song: "Across the Field"
- Athletics conference: Ohio Heritage Conference
- Sports: Football, Volleyball, Quick Recall, Cross Country, M/W Basketball, Track and Field, M/W Tennis, Baseball, Softball, Cheerleading, Marching Band
- Mascot: Indian
- Nickname: Big Red
- Team name: Indians
- Rival: Greenview, Southeastern, Madison Plains
- Accreditation: North Central Association of Colleges and Schools

Cedarville High School is a public high school in Cedarville, Ohio. It is the only high school in the Cedar Cliff Local School District. Some notable things the school has accomplished recently are the cross country team qualifying for the State mMeet in 2018 and 2019. Their boys basketball team has won the OHC South in 2021 and 2024. Their volleyball team won back to back OHC South titles from 2023-2024.
