= Great Council State Park =

Park in Ohio, USA

- The main building in 2026

- Location within Ohio Location within the United States
- Location: Oldtown, Xenia Township, Greene County, Ohio, United States
- Coordinates: 39°43′45″N 83°56′14″W
- Area: 14.7 acres (5.9 ha)
- Established: June 7, 2024; 2 years ago
- Administrator: Ohio Department of Natural Resources
- Designation: Ohio state park

Great Council State Park is located in the Oldtown area of Xenia Township, Greene County, Ohio, United States.

In February 2021, the state of Ohio agreed to purchase a 0.7-acre (0.28 ha) site along U.S. Route 68 (US 68), south of Brush Row Road, in Oldtown, north of Xenia, housing the Tecumseh Motel, for $260,000. The state planned to redevelop the property as a state park in honor of Tecumseh (c. 1768 – October 5, 1813), the Shawnee leader who was killed in the War of 1812 and became an iconic folk hero in American, Indigenous, and Canadian history. The park would educate the public about Tecumseh and the Shawnee people, and its focal point would be a 2,000-to-3,000-square-foot (190 to 280 m^{2}) interpretative center.

The park's location was chosen due to the Shawnee history in the area: Oldtown is on the former site of the large Shawnee settlement commonly referred to as Old Chillicothe, led by Chief Blackfish, which had a population of 1000 between 1777 and 1780, and Old Chillicothe's council house is believed to have been located on a high ridge behind the motel; the park's location is also due to the earlier mistaken belief that Tecumseh had been born in Old Chillicothe. The park was to be developed by the Ohio Department of Natural Resources (ODNR) in coordination with the Ohio History Connection, the Eastern Shawnee Tribe of Oklahoma, the Shawnee Tribe and the Absentee Shawnee, and run by ODNR.

In January 2022, it was reported that the size of the interpretive center would be increased to 6,000 to 7,000 sq ft (560 to 650 m^{2}) and its design would be a modern interpretation of the traditional council house form used by the Shawnee as a primary gathering place and dwelling; it was also reported that ODNR hoped to secure more land for the park.

Ground was broken for the park on June 27, 2022. During the ceremony, it was announced that the interpretive center was now planned to be 12,000 sq ft (1,100 m^{2}); it would include three floors of exhibits, with a skylight on the roof and a second-floor balcony with a view of the settlement site. There would be a "living stream" centerpiece with bluegills, crayfish and other native aquatic life on the main floor, a theater, and a basement-level gallery; the gallery would meet museum-grade curation standards, with strict environmental and security controls for curated and traveling exhibits, displays, and artifacts. Displays were to honor the history of the Shawnee people and allow present-day Shawnee to share their stories. Also highlighted would be historic settlers like Daniel Boone, who was held captive in Old Chillicothe for several months in 1778.

In September 2023, it was reported that ODNR had recently acquired 14 acres (5.7 ha) of land next to the interpretive center, with plans for a loop hiking trail around a native prairie; it was reported at the park's opening that the hiking trail would lead to the Little Miami River, past vegetable gardens growing the Three Sisters: corn, beans and squash. It was also reported in September 2023 that the park's total construction budget was $11.4 million.

Great Council State Park opened on June 7, 2024 as Ohio's 76th state park; outside the interpretive center, a bronze sculpture of Tecumseh was unveiled by sculptor Alan Cottrill. Long-term plans call for a bridge over US 68 connecting the park to the nearby Little Miami Scenic Trail.

== See also ==
- List of memorials to Tecumseh
