= Tecumseh, Indiana =

- Census-designated place
- Location of Tecumseh in Vigo County, Indiana.
- Coordinates: 39°34′06″N 87°25′51″W
- Country: United States
- State: Indiana
- County: Vigo
- Township: Fayette

Area
  - Total: 3.55 sq mi (9.20 km^{2})
  - Land: 3.47 sq mi (9.00 km^{2})
  - Water: 0.077 sq mi (0.20 km^{2})
- Elevation: 558 ft (170 m)

Population (2020)
  - Total: 778
  - Density: 223.8/sq mi (86.41/km^{2})
- Time zone: UTC-5 (Eastern (EST))
  - Summer (DST): UTC-4 (EDT)
- ZIP code: 47885
- Area codes: 812, 930
- GNIS feature ID: 2629776

Tecumseh is an unincorporated census-designated place in eastern Fayette Township, Vigo County, in the U.S. state of Indiana. It is part of the Terre Haute metropolitan area. As of the 2020 census, Tecumseh had a population of 778.

== History ==
Located on the Wabash River, the community was named for Tecumseh, the Native American leader of the Shawnee who fought General William Henry Harrison at Fort Harrison, only a mile south of the town. Tecumseh was once known as Durkee's Ferry, and in 1890 it was merely a post-office with five or six houses. Durkee's Ferry was once one of the main crossing points on the Wabash River.

A post office was established at Tecumseh in 1882, and remained in operation until it was discontinued in 1907.

== Demographics ==
Historical population
Census	Pop.	Note	%±
2020	778		—
U.S. Decennial Census

== Education ==
All areas in Vigo County are in the Vigo County School Corporation. Tecumseh is zoned to Fayette Elementary School, West Vigo Middle School and West Vigo High School. West Vigo Middle School, and West Vigo High School.
