= Preston, Indiana =

- Unincorporated community
- Vigo County's location in Indiana

- location in Vigo County, Indiana
- Coordinates: 39°30′24″N 87°22′19″W
- Country: United States
- State: Indiana
- County: Vigo
- Township: Harrison
- Elevation: 512 ft (156 m)
- Time zone: UTC-5 (Eastern (EST))
  - Summer (DST): UTC-4 (EDT)
- ZIP code: 47804
- Area codes: 812, 930
- GNIS feature ID: 441578

Preston is an unincorporated community in Harrison Township, Vigo County, in the U.S. state of Indiana.

Now within the boundaries of the city of Terre Haute, it is also part of the Terre Haute metropolitan area.

== Geography ==
Preston is located at 39°30′24″N 87°22′19″W at an elevation of 512 feet.
