= Dewey, Indiana =

- Unincorporated community
- Vigo County's location in Indiana

- location in Vigo County, Indiana
- Coordinates: 39°30′34″N 87°22′33″W
- Country: United States
- State: Indiana
- County: Vigo
- Township: Harrison
- Elevation: 469 ft (143 m)
- Time zone: UTC-5 (Eastern (EST))
  - Summer (DST): UTC-4 (EDT)
- ZIP code: 47805
- Area codes: 812, 930
- GNIS feature ID: 433522

Dewey is an unincorporated community in Harrison Township, Vigo County, in the U.S. state of Indiana.

Within the boundaries of Terre Haute, it is also part of the Terre Haute metropolitan area.

== Geography ==
Dewey is located at 39°30′34″N 87°22′33″W at an elevation of 469 feet.
