= Leeper Park =

- U.S. National Register of Historic Places
- U.S. Historic district
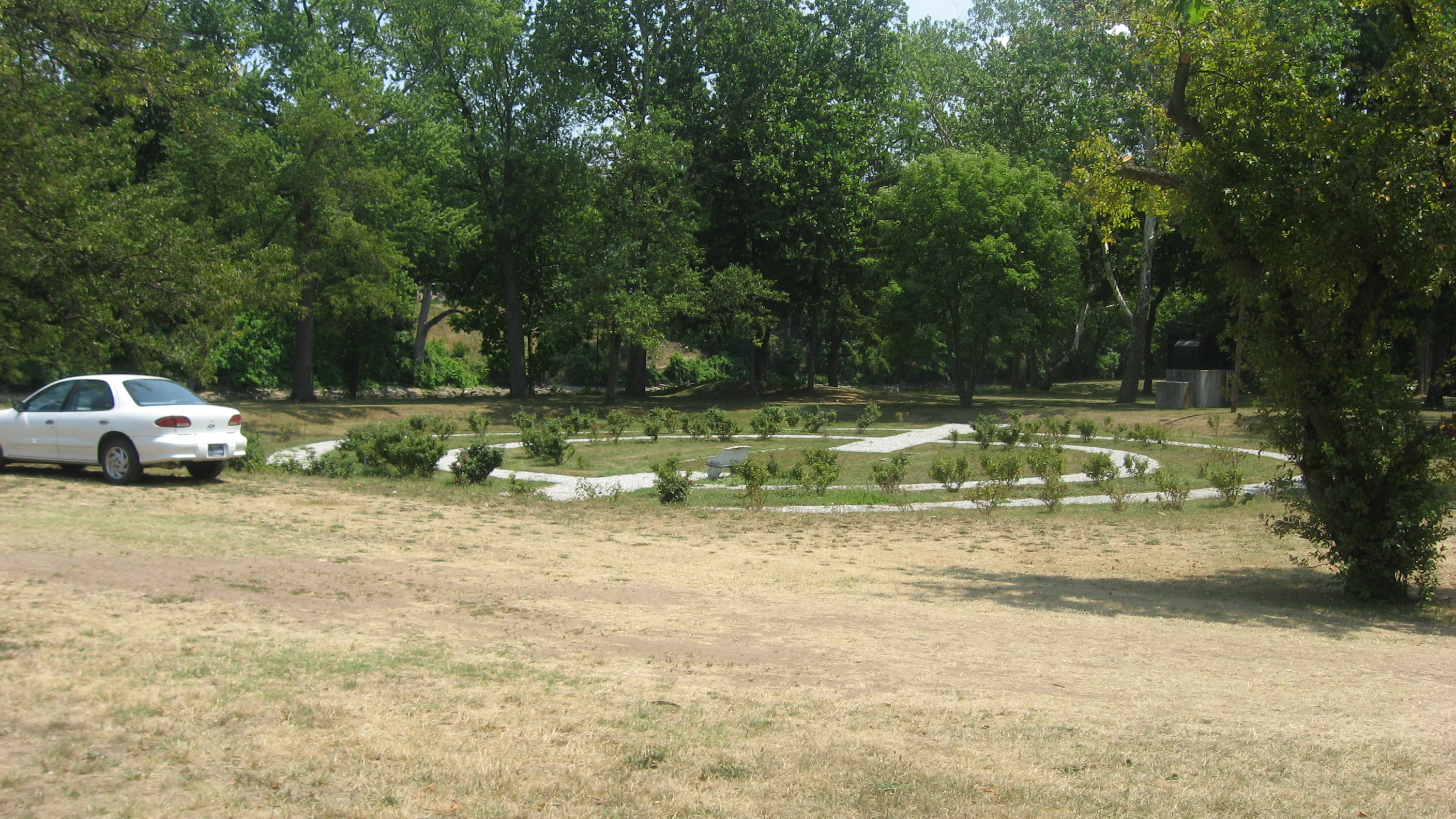
- Sunken rose garden in Leeper Park, July 2012

- Location within Indiana Location within the United States
- Location: Roughly bounded by St. Joseph R, Park Ln., and Bartlett St., South Bend, Indiana
- Coordinates: 41°41′11″N 86°15′07″W
- Area: 25 acres (10 ha)
- Built: 1895, 1905, 1912
- Architect: Kessler, George Edward
- Architectural style: Victorian landscape
- NRHP reference No.: 00000679
- Added to NRHP: June 15, 2000

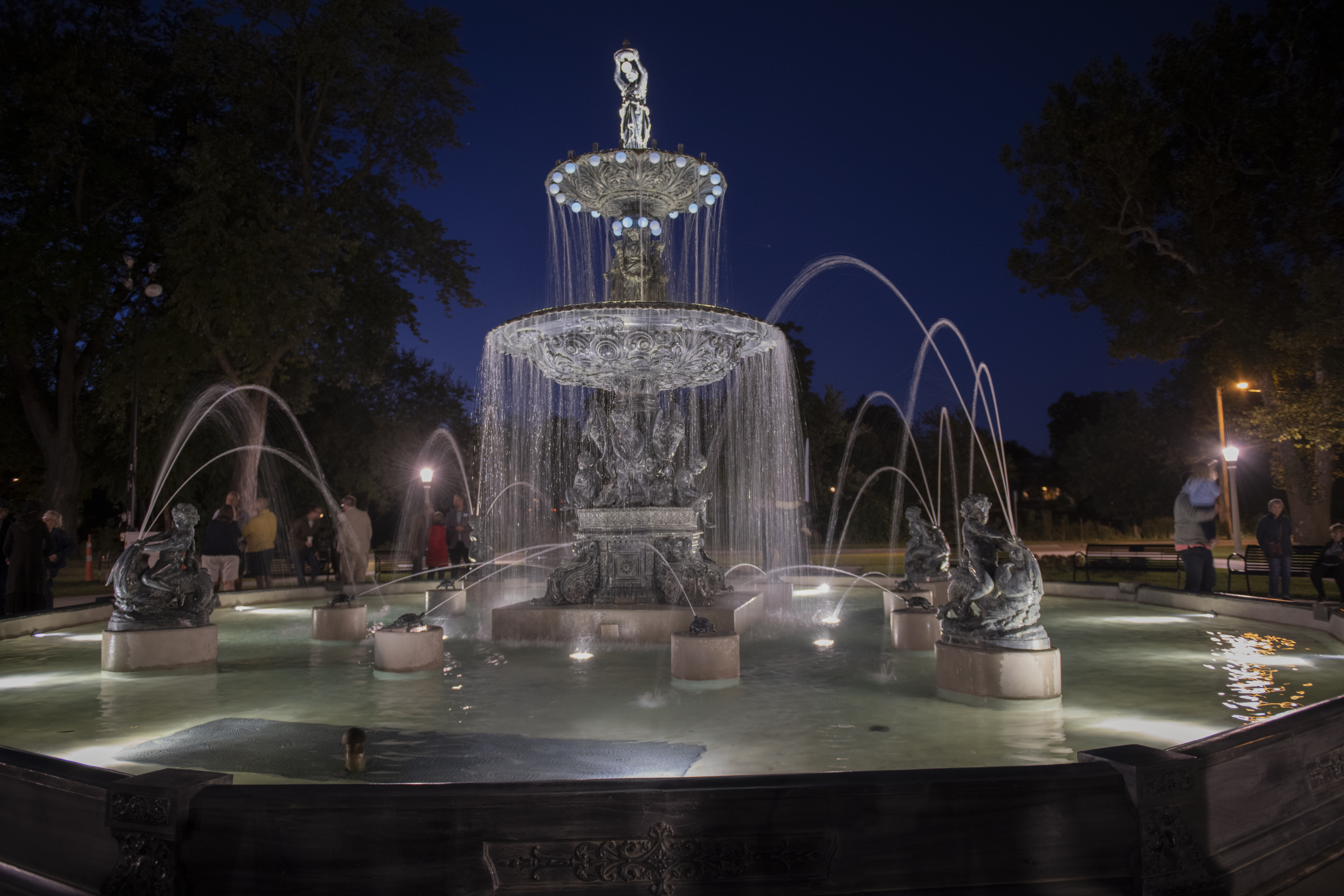
The restored Studebaker Fountain at Leeper Park

Leeper Park is a historic public park and national historic district located at South Bend, Indiana. The district encompasses four contributing buildings, nine contributing structures, and one contributing object in a public park. It was designed by landscape architect George Kessler, who issued the master plan for the park in 1915. Later improvements to the park were made by the Works Progress Administration in the 1930s.

Leeper Park is named for David R. Leeper who was elected Mayor of South Bend in 1892.

The Navarre Cabin, home of Pierre Navarre, an early settler of South Bend, was relocated to the park in 1904, and relocated out of the park in 2024.

It was listed on the National Register of Historic Places in 2000.
