= George Kessler =

American pioneer city planner and landscape architect

George E. Kessler
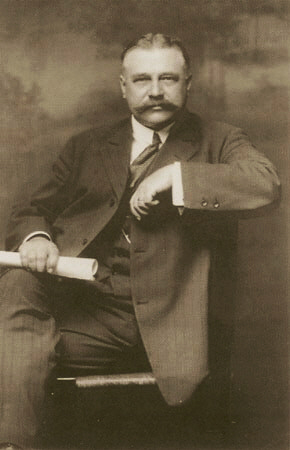
- Born: July 16, 1862; Frankenhausen, Principality of Schwarzburg-Rudolstadt
- Died: March 20, 1923; Indianapolis, Indiana, United States
- Resting place: Bellefontaine Cemetery; St. Louis, Missouri
- Spouse: Ida Grant Field of St. Louis (m. 1900)
- Children: George Edward Kessler, Jr.
- Parent(s): Edward Carl Kessler; Adolphe Clotilde Zetzsche Kessler

George Edward Kessler (July 16, 1862 – March 20, 1923) was an American pioneer city planner and landscape architect.

Over the course of his forty-one year career, George E. Kessler completed over 200 projects and prepared plans for 26 communities, 26 park and boulevard systems, 49 parks, 46 estates and residences, and 26 schools. His projects are in 100 cities in 23 states, such as in Shanghai, New York, and Mexico City.

== Early life and education ==
George E. Kessler was born in Frankenhausen, Principality of Schwarzburg-Rudolstadt, to Edward Carl Kessler and Adolphe Clotilde Zeitsche Kessler on July 16, 1862. In 1865, the family, including George's sister, Fredericka Antionette Louisa, emigrated to the United States. After living briefly in New Jersey, Missouri, and Wisconsin, the family ultimately settled in Dallas, Texas, where George's father and uncle invested in a cotton plantation. His father died in 1878. At the age of sixteen, George became a cashboy at Sanger Brothers Dry Goods.

After consultation with relatives, Clotilde decided that landscape architecture would combine the right degree of creativity and practicality to suit her son's temperament. The family moved back to Germany, where George received formal training. He undertook a two-year apprenticeship at the private landscape gardening school at the Grand Ducal Gardens in Weimar, Germany, where he studied botany, forestry, and design under Hofgärtner Armin Sckell and Garteninspector Julius Hartwig.

He then worked for several months with Haage and Schmidt, a major German plant nursery in Erfurt. He received further training in Charlottenburg and Potsdam that included a brief study at Gaertner Lehr Anstalt, the school of garden design founded by Peter Joseph Lenné; technical engineering study at Gartner-Lehranstalt; study with Hofgärtner Theodore Neitner at the Neue Garten; and study at the Polytechnicum, the premier horticultural library in Germany.

Upon completion of a course in civil engineering at the University of Jena, he toured central and western Europe and southern England for one year with a tutor in order to study civic design in major cities from Paris to Moscow.

He recalled, "Of all of it, the travel was of most value."

== Career ==
=== First job and Merriam Park ===
In October 1881, the Kessler family returned to New York. From January to March 1882, Kessler sent four letters to Frederick Law Olmsted. The January 22 letter is the first record of his attempt to begin work in the United States. In the letter Kessler wrote of his studies and travel in Europe and wondered about an arboretum job at Boston's Arnold Arboretum. In the February 15 letter, Kessler wrote that he was "certain of a situation in Central Park" and of an offer of a partnership with a florist in Woodlawn. He wrote, "Since November, I have been in the employ of A. LeMoult 172 and 174 Bowery, having charge of his greenhouse, seed, and grass stock. Decoration of concert halls were also mostly in my care." Kessler also sent drawings.

Olmsted responded in March and urged Kessler "to be ambitious to be master in higher fields" than pleasure grounds and home gardens. Also Olmsted encouraged Kessler to educate himself about nature through reading, reflection, and excursions, and to aim to free himself from German associations in order to expand his capabilities and to not limit his influence and opportunities. A recommended reading list of books was included. Olmsted concluded by writing that the Kansas City, Fort Scott, and Gulf Railway Company might be in need of a man to take charge of a public picnic or excursion ground. He told Kessler that the railroad's president, H.H. Hunniwell, would be in New York, and that Olmsted had given him Kessler's address.

On March 18, Kessler provided additional information on his work in the Bowery and wrote that if he stayed with LeMoult, he would receive US$15 per week. The last letter to Olmsted on March 23 stated that Kessler was taking a position with the railroad at Merriam Park in Johnson County, Kansas, for a salary of forty dollars per month. The work was to design and supervise the construction of the railroad's pleasure park.

Merriam Park was located ten miles (16 km) southwest of Kansas City, Missouri. Kessler, along with his mother and sister, moved to a house on John Mastin's Johnson County farm. Beside working on the park, Kessler was caretaker of the farm property.

Although Merriam Park had been dedicated in 1880, when Kessler arrived there was only one building intended for visitors, a square dance floor, and nearly all the valuable trees had been cut down for cordwood. Less than two years after Kessler started, the park had become a great success. The park had been enclosed with a fence and the main entrance was an ornamental archway. Features included an open-air shelter for large public gatherings, wild animal exhibits, picnic grounds, a pavilion, a lake, tennis courts, croquet grounds, a horse-drawn merry-go-round, numerous swings, and a baseball diamond. Admission cost 25 cents and the park attracted more than 20,000 visitors each day. Details of the park before and after Kessler's work are described in The Life and Work of George Edward Kessler.

Kessler maintained a nursery in the park filled with a large variety of trees and shrubs. He was responsible for sales from the park's icehouse and arranged excursions to the park. In addition to his work at Merriam Park, Kessler prepared landscape plans and supervised the maintenance of many of the railroad's stations in Kansas and Missouri. He managed the company's two experimental tree farms totaling 1,500 acres (610 ha) near Farlington, Kansas.

=== Kansas City ===
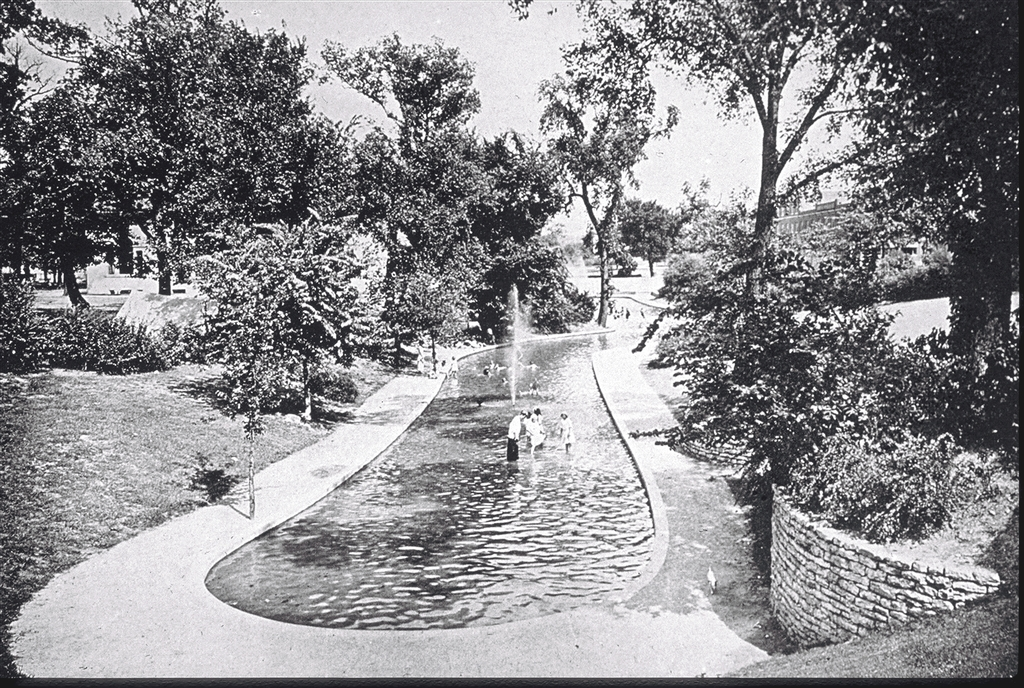
The Paseo at 17th Street, Kansas City, Missouri, was completed in 1897.

Kessler soon opened an office in Kansas City and went looking for more work. In 1887, he was commissioned to bring order to a hollow that formed the center of Kansas City's fashionable Hyde Park neighborhood. Kessler landscaped the hollow and then encircled it with a boulevard to prevent residents from turning it into part of their backyards. The layout spurred sales of stately homes along the boulevard.

The success of the project drew the attention of Kansas City Star publisher William Rockhill Nelson, who would champion the City Beautiful Movement.

On May 31, 1890, Kessler applied to become the landscape architect for the city's newly created Park Board. Following court challenges on whether the city could issue bonds to fund parks, Kansas City finally got the approvals to create a park board on March 5, 1892, thanks to the efforts of August Meyer. Kessler had earlier designed the grounds of Meyer's house in what is today's Kansas City Art Institute. Kansas City's model for park and boulevard systems would be used by numerous cities. Kessler was hired as the board's engineer.

Kessler later worked with Meyer to lay out the city's street grid including a parks and boulevard system. The initial 1893 plan called for 9.85 miles (15.85 km) of boulevards and 323.45 acres (1.3090 km^{2}) of parks. The Paseo was named after the famed Paseo de la Reforma, one of Mexico City's most fashionable boulevards.

Between 1899 and 1901, he worked on the first plans for Gage Park in Topeka.

On May 14, 1900, Kessler married Ida Grant Field of Kansas City, Missouri. They had one son, George Edward Kessler Jr.

=== Booming practice ===
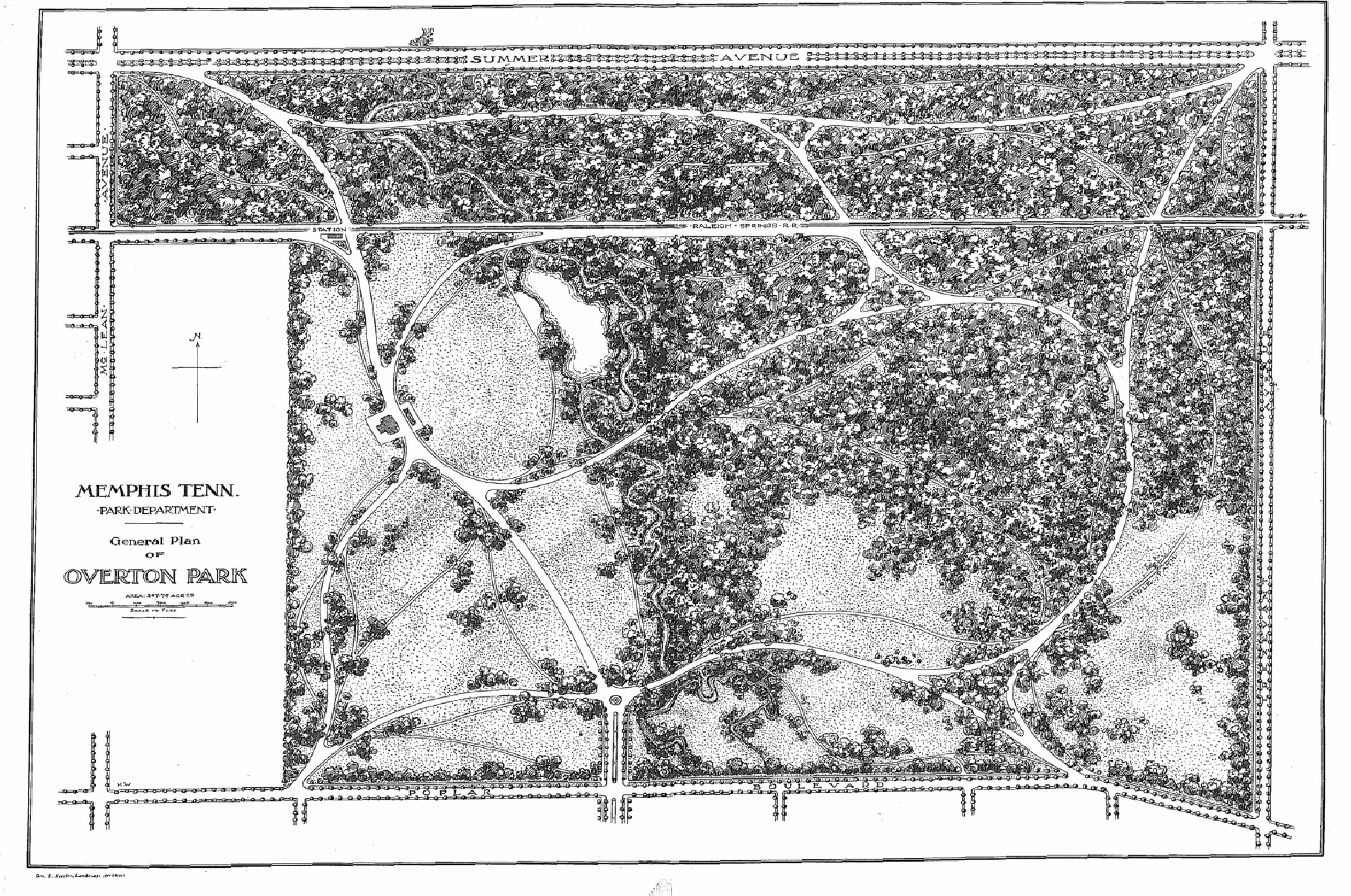
George Kessler made a plan for Overton Park in Memphis, Tennessee, c. 1901.

Beginning in 1901 and continuing through 1914, Kessler designed the Memphis Park and Parkway System. His plan for Memphis included two major urban parks and a loop of landscaped roadway connecting them. In 1904, he designed and landscaped the grounds at the Louisiana Purchase Exposition in St. Louis, Missouri.

He designed Fair Park in Dallas in 1904, but his biggest contribution to that city was his Kessler Plan, which he created in 1909. That year the Dallas Chamber of Commerce established the City Plan and Improvement League and hired Kessler to design a long-range plan of civic improvements for Dallas. His plans aimed to prevent the uncontrollable flooding of the Trinity River, improve the narrow, crooked downtown streets, fix the dangerous railroad crossings, and construct the Central Expressway. His plans were not implemented at that time, being deemed "impractical", but later it became clear that changes were needed. The Central Expressway project was finally realized 40 years after the Kessler Plan was first presented.

On the strength of his acclaimed plan for the Louisiana Purchase Exposition in St. Louis, in 1905 Vanderbilt University in Nashville, Tennessee, contracted Kessler and Company to prepare a master plan. However, Kessler's plan was overly aggressive and suggested removing nearly all the original campus structures. University leadership disagreed and wanted to preserve existing buildings and so, with the exception of one new building, the plan was not adopted.

In 1910, Kessler moved to St. Louis. In 1912 and 1913, he designed the expansive Longview Farm for Robert A. Long, south of Kansas City. With over 1,700 acres (690 ha), it was a community bigger than some small towns, with over 50 buildings. The landscaping earned the farm the title of The World's Most Beautiful Farm. The community had underground electricity, filtered water from a 100,000-US-gallon (380,000 L) water tower, steam heating, and indoor plumbing, as well as 7 miles (11 km) of macadamized roads that were innovative for that era. The landscape layout around the mansion included manicured shrubbery, fountains, and a tennis court.

In 1911–1912, he further developed and refined plans for the Fort Wayne Park and Boulevard System originally developed by Charles Mulford Robinson in 1909.

Kessler was hired to resolve a politically charged development dispute involving the park system of Indianapolis in 1908. He studied the city for one year before submitting his plan for a park and boulevard system, which was adopted in 1909. Kessler led the city's Park Commission until 1915. He issued a master plan for Leeper Park in South Bend, Indiana, in 1915.

In 1918, Kessler returned to act as consulting engineer for the Dallas Property Owner's Association, and in 1919, began working for the Metropolitan Development Association of the Dallas Chamber of Commerce. On January 3, 1922, he returned to St. Louis. His plans for the Trinity River were finally implemented in the 1930s.

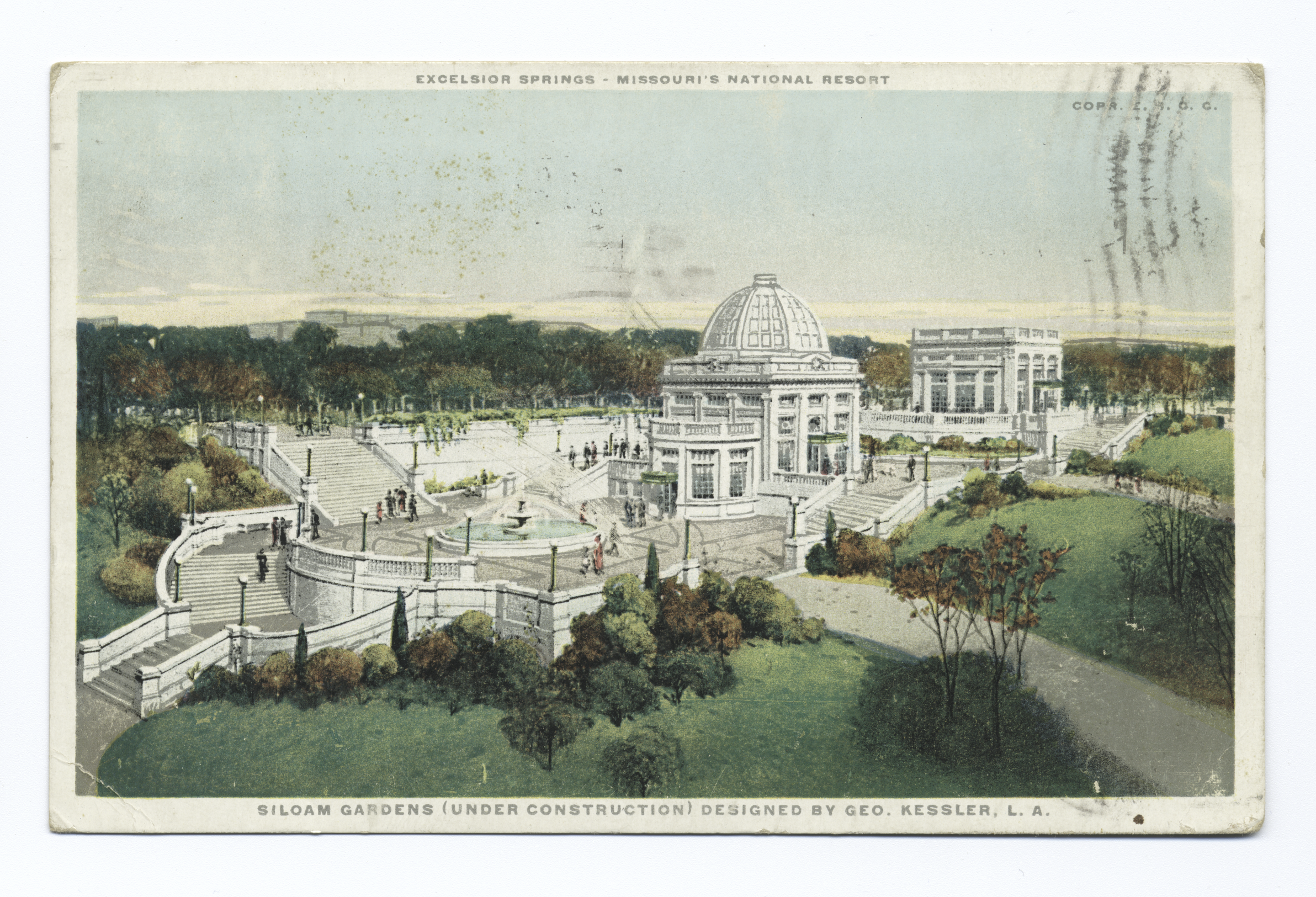
Siloam Gardens, Excelsior Springs, Missouri, built 1923, demolished 1935

Kessler drafted city plans for Cincinnati, Ohio; Terre Haute, Indiana; Cleveland, Ohio; El Paso, Texas; Denver, Colorado; Sherman, Texas; and Syracuse, New York. He designed Camp Wilson, an army cantonment near San Antonio, Texas.

=== Death and memorials ===
In 1920, George Kessler was again hired by Indianapolis. He was supervising the construction of a new major east/west belt road on March 20, 1923, when he died. He was survived by his wife and son and was buried in Bellefontaine Cemetery in St. Louis.

The Indianapolis road he was supervising was named Kessler Boulevard in his honor. In Dallas, the Kessler Park neighborhood is named for him. Longview, Washington, named Kessler Boulevard and Kessler Elementary School in his honor.

Kessler was a founder of the American Institute of Planners and an original member of the United States Commission of Fine Arts.

Kessler was a Freemason in Rural Lodge No. 316, Kansas City, Missouri. He became a 32° Scottish Rite Mason in the Western Missouri Consistory of the Valley of Kansas City in 1903.

== See also ==
- Burnett Park, Fort Worth, Texas
