= Terre Town, Indiana =

- Unincorporated community
- Vigo County's location in Indiana

- location in Vigo County, Indiana
- Coordinates: 39°31′03″N 87°22′31″W
- Country: United States
- State: Indiana
- County: Vigo
- Township: Harrison
- Elevation: 469 ft (143 m)
- Time zone: UTC-5 (Eastern (EST))
  - Summer (DST): UTC-4 (EDT)
- ZIP code: 47805
- Area codes: 812, 930
- GNIS feature ID: 444649

Terre Town is an unincorporated community in northern Harrison Township, Vigo County, in the U.S. state of Indiana. Now within the borders of the city of Terre Haute, it is part of the Terre Haute metropolitan area.

The community is home to Terre Town Elementary School.

== Geography ==
Terre Town is located at 39°31′03″N 87°22′31″W at an elevation of 469 feet.
