= Libertyville, Indiana =

- Unincorporated community
- Vigo County's location in Indiana

- Location in Vigo County, Indiana
- Coordinates: 39°36′18″N 87°31′06″W
- Country: United States
- State: Indiana
- County: Vigo
- Township: Fayette
- Elevation: 607 ft (185 m)
- Time zone: UTC-5 (Eastern (EST))
  - Summer (DST): UTC-4 (EDT)
- ZIP code: 47885
- FIPS code: 18-43632
- GNIS feature ID: 2830564

Libertyville is an unincorporated community in Vermillion and Vigo counties, in the U.S. state of Indiana. The county is in the Terre Haute metropolitan area.

== History ==
A post office was established at Libertyville in 1871, and remained in operation until it was discontinued in 1904.

== Geography ==
Libertyville is located along U.S. Highway 150.

== Demographics ==
The United States Census Bureau first delineated Libertyville as a census designated place in the 2022 American Community Survey.
