= West Vigo High School =

Location
- 4590 West Sarah Myers Drive; West Terre Haute postal address, Indiana 47885; United States; 39.4627°N 87.4888°W

Information
- Type: Public high school
- Established: 1961
- School district: Vigo County School Corporation
- Principal: Ryan Easton
- Teaching staff: 47.09 (FTE)
- Grades: 9-12
- Enrollment: 518 (2023-2024)
- Student to teacher ratio: 11.00
- Color
- Athletics conference: Western Indiana Conference
- Team name: Vikings
- Website: Official Site

West Vigo High School is a public high school located in Sugar Creek Township, Vigo County, Indiana, with a West Terre Haute postal address. It is a part of the Vigo County School Corporation. As the name implies, the school's district covers the western portion of Vigo County. Communities in its attendance boundary include the municipality of West Terre Haute and the census-designated places of Dresser, New Goshen, St. Mary of the Woods, Shepardsville, and Toad Hop.

It is known for its basketball court, called the Green Dome. The middle school is connected with the high school. West Vigo High School varsity sports teams include: baseball, basketball, soccer, softball, tennis, football, track & field, cross country, swimming, volleyball, wrestling, and golf.

== See also ==
- List of high schools in Indiana
