= Tecumseh (lake freighter) =

Bulk carrier

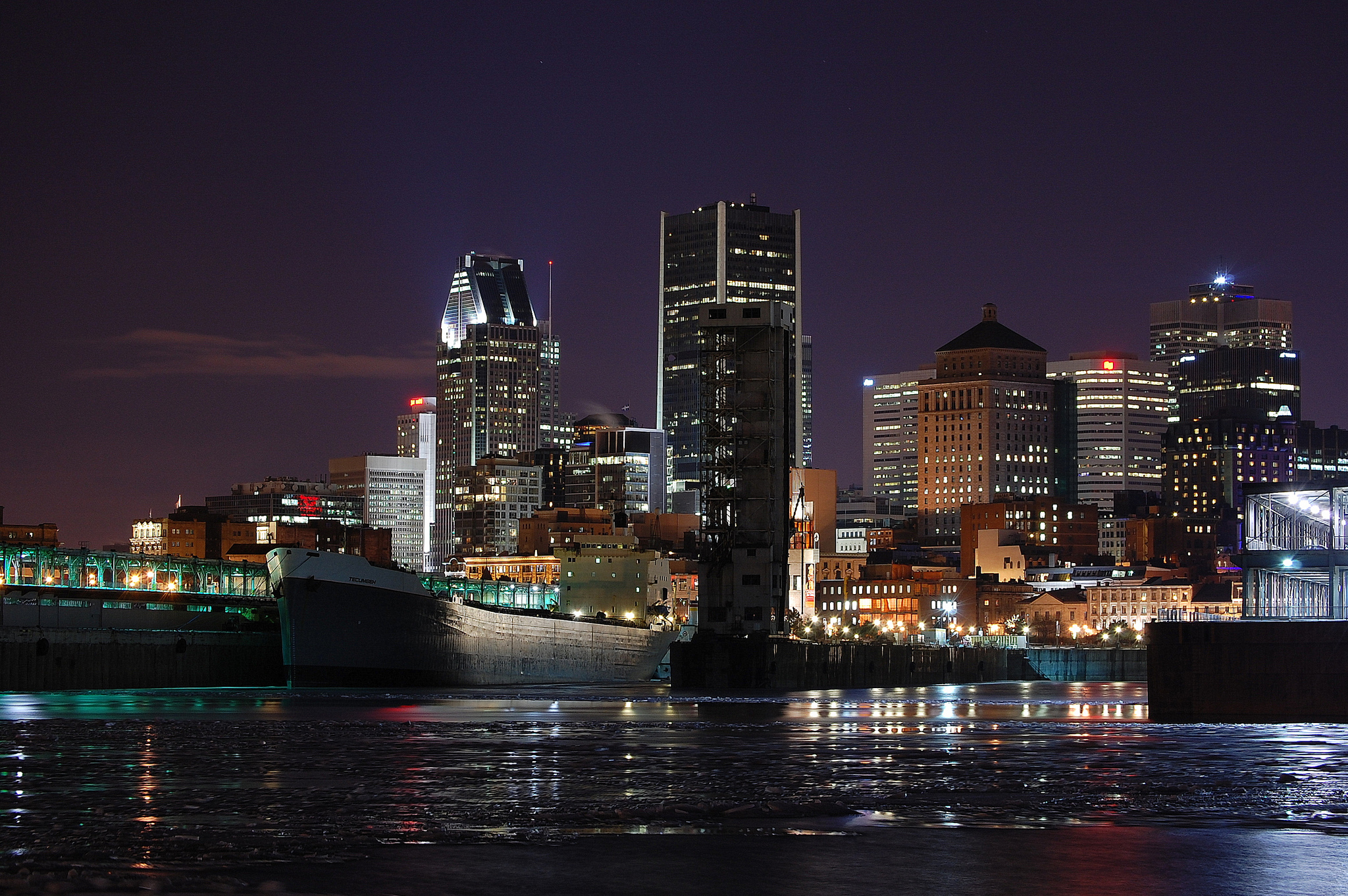
- Tecumseh docked at Montreal in February 2012

History
- Name: Sugar Islander (1973–1996); Islander (1996); Judy Litrico (1996–2006); Tina Litrico (2006–2011); Tecumseh (2011–present)
- Port of registry: (United States) New Orleans, Louisiana (1973–2011); (Canada) Port Dover, Ontario (2011–present)
- Builder: Lockheed Shipbuilding and Construction Company, Seattle, Washington
- Yard number: 139
- Launched: 22 August 1972
- Completed: August 1973
- Identification: IMO number: 7225855; MMSI Number: 316021177; Call sign: CFN5905
- Fate: Scrapped

General characteristics
- Type: Lake freighter
- Tonnage: 18,049 GT; 29,984 DWT
- Length: 195.4 m (641 ft 1 in) oa; 189 m (620 ft 1 in) pp
- Beam: 23.8 m (78 ft 1 in)
- Propulsion: 2 4,500 kW (6,000 bhp) SEMT Pielstick 12PC-CV-400 diesel engines; 1 shaft
- Speed: 15 knots (28 km/h; 17 mph)
- Capacity: 33,867 m^{3} (1,195,986 ft^{3})

MV Tecumseh was a bulk carrier owned and operated by Canadian shipping firm Lower Lakes Towing. It was built in 1973 as Sugar Islander in Seattle, Washington for the Bankers Trust Company, but later was purchased and operated by other companies. In 1995, the ship was renamed Islander, followed by Judy Litrico in 1996. In 2008, the name changed again to Trina Litrico before the ship was sold to Lower Lakes Towing in 2011. The ship operated on the Great Lakes primarily transporting grain. In 2019, Tecumseh suffered an engine fire that left the ship out of control on the Detroit River. The vessel was scrapped in 2023.

== Description ==
As built, the bulk carrier was 195.4 metres (641 ft 1 in) long overall and 189 m (620 ft 1 in) between perpendiculars with a beam of 23.8 m (78 ft 1 in). The ship has a midsummer draught of 10.5 m (34 ft 6 in) and a depth of hold of 13.79 m (45 ft 3 in). As built, the ship measured 15,544 gross register tons (GRT) and a 30,124 tons deadweight (DWT). The ship is powered by two 4,500-kilowatt (6,000 bhp) SEMT Pielstick 12PC-CV-400 diesel engines turning one shaft. The ship has a maximum speed of 15 knots (28 km/h; 17 mph), and a cruising speed of 12.6 knots (23.3 km/h; 14.5 mph). In 2012, the ship underwent conversion to a lake freighter and was remeasured 18,049 gross tonnage (GT) and 29,984 DWT. The vessel has capacity for 33,866.6 m^{3} (1,195,986 ft^{3}) and carries a crew of between 13 and 15.

== Construction and career ==
The ship was constructed by Lockheed Shipbuilding & Engineering Company at Seattle, Washington for the Bankers Trust Company and was launched on 22 August 1972. Named Sugar Islander, the vessel was completed in August 1973 and registered in New Orleans, Louisiana. In 1995, the ship was acquired by Islander Shipholding and renamed Islander, before they changed it to Judy Litrico the following year. In 1998, Judy Litrico was acquired by US United Ocean Services LLC. They renamed the ship Tina Litrico in 2006. When purchased by the Lower Lakes Towing Company in 2011, it was renamed Tecumseh and re-registered at Port Dover, Ontario. The ship underwent a refit at Veracruz, Mexico before sailing to the Great Lakes. Tecumseh arrived at Montreal, Quebec on 29 December 2011 where it was fitted with Port Colborne fairleads from the scrapped Canadian Leader. Since entering service on the Great Lakes, the bulk carrier is primarily used to transport grains.

On 15 December 2019, the 16 crewmembers aboard Tecumseh were taken off the ship after a fire broke out in the engine room. The ship had been travelling from Thunder Bay, Ontario, Ontario to Windsor, Ontario carrying a load of canola. The United States Coast Guard responded to the fire, which happened off Zug Island in the Detroit River, on the United States side. The vessel, out of control, then drifted over to the Canadian side of the river. The ship was anchored on the Canadian side near Windsor.

On 29 July 2023, it was announced that Tecumseh was going to be scrapped in Port Colborne, Ontario after being laid up in Ashtabula since 2020.

== Sources ==
- "Tecumseh". boatnerd.com. Archived from the original on 3 July 2017.
- "Sugar Islander (7225855)". Miramar Ship Index.
- "M/V Tecumseh". Rand Logisitics.
