= Ohio Boulevard–Deming Park Historic District =

Historic district in Indiana, United States

- Ohio Boulevard–Deming Park
- U.S. National Register of Historic Places
- U.S. Historic district
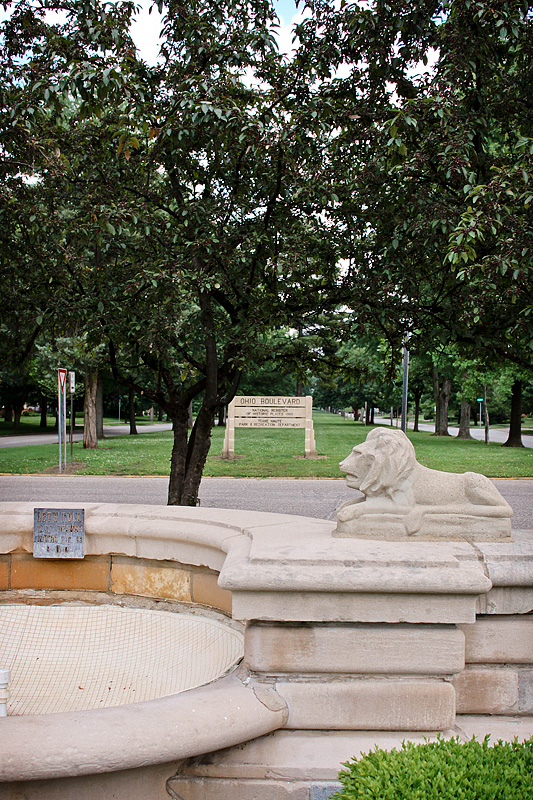

- Location within Vigo County, Indiana Location within Indiana Location within the United States
- Location: Roughly Ohio Boulevard from 19th to Keane, Terre Haute, Indiana; United States
- Coordinates: 39°27′57″N 87°21′39″W
- Architect: George E. Kessler
- NRHP reference No.: 89001425
- Added to NRHP: September 14, 1989

Ohio Boulevard–Deming Park Historic District is a boulevard in Terre Haute, Indiana.

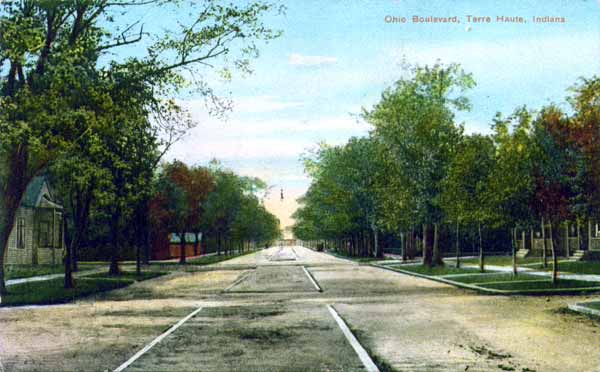
Ohio Boulevard circa 1910

Designed by architect and city planner George E. Kessler, the boulevard is 1.5 miles (2.4 km) long. At its start at the intersection with 19th Street is an entrance including a stone structure on either side of the road. There the road is 106 feet (32 m) wide, expanding to 190 feet (58 m) wide at 20th street to accommodate an 80-foot-wide (24 m) median.

The median is maintained by the city of Terre Haute as city park land. In the teardrop-shaped green space formed as the boulevard branches and widens between 19th and 20th streets is a fountain, restored in 2002. This small area was dedicated as Remembrance Plaza on September 11, 2002, in honor of those who lost their lives in the September 11 attacks one year prior.

The boulevard was placed on the National Register of Historic Places in 1989 for its significance in architecture, landscaping and the history of the region.

== Deming Park ==
Demas Deming Jr., the son of an early settler of Terre Haute, began developing the district on a large tract of land owned by his family. Using money acquired from the sale of another parcel of land to the city of Terre Haute that became Deming Park, around 1921 the Deming family created a scenic boulevard with a scenic parkway in the middle stretching from 19th Street to Fruitridge Avenue. Currently, the park consists of 177 acres (0.72 km^{2}) and includes a public swimming pool, an 18-hole disc golf course, the Oakley Playground and the Clark-Landsbaum Holly Arboretum.
