= Mount Tecumseh =

Mountain in New Hampshire, United States

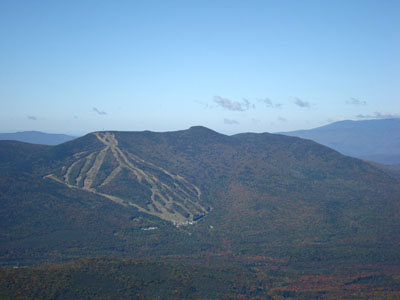
- Mt. Tecumseh as seen from Middle Tripyramid

Highest point
- Elevation: 3,997 ft (1,218 m)
- Prominence: 1,723 ft (525 m)
- Listing: White Mountain 4000-Footers
- Coordinates: 43°58′02″N 71°33′29″W

Geography
- Location: Grafton County, New Hampshire, U.S.
- Topo map: USGS Waterville Valley

Mount Tecumseh is a mountain located in Grafton County, New Hampshire. The mountain is named after the Shawnee leader Tecumseh (c. 1768–1813), and is a part of the White Mountains. The east side of Tecumseh drains into the Mad River; the west side drains into several brooks. All are tributaries of the Pemigewasset River, which drains into the Merrimack River and thence into the Gulf of Maine in Massachusetts.

Mount Tecumseh is the site of the Waterville Valley Resort, one of the largest ski areas in New Hampshire.

Long believed to stand 4,003 feet in height, Mt. Tecumseh was the lowest on the Appalachian Mountain Club list of "four-thousand footers." As of July 2019, however, a new survey marker on the summit indicates an elevation of 3,997 feet.

== Gallery ==
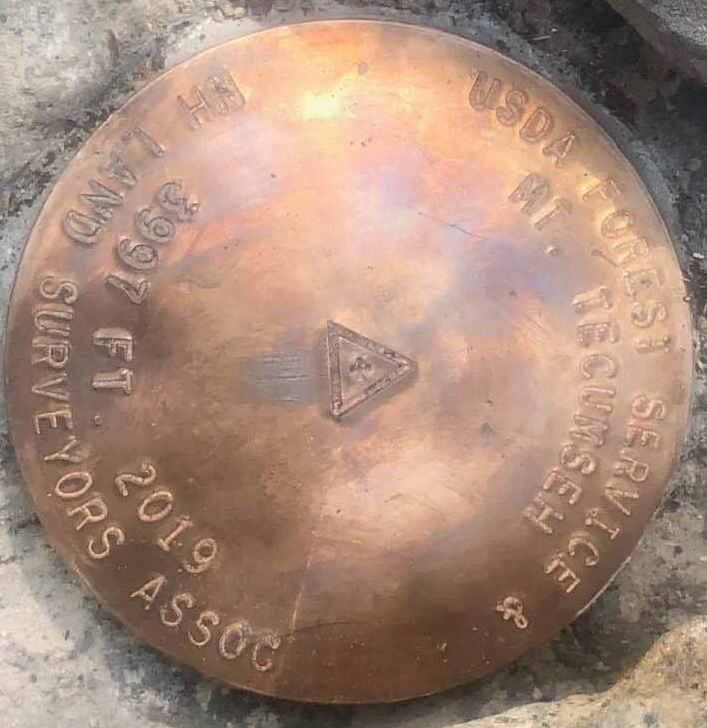
A survey marker on the summit indicates a new elevation of 3,997 feet.

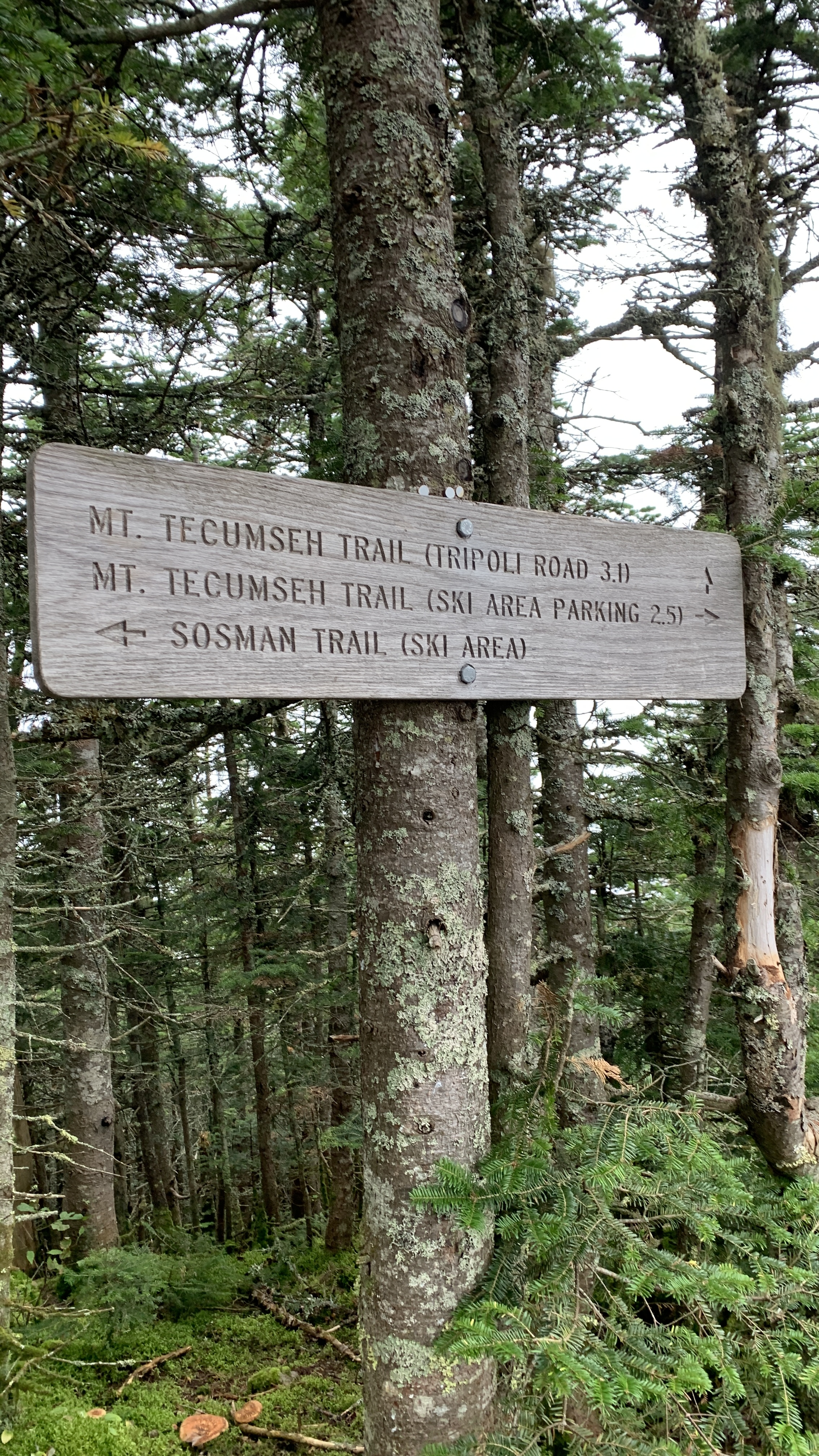
A sign on the trail up to the summit of Mt. Tecumseh.

== See also ==
- List of mountains in New Hampshire
- List of memorials to Tecumseh
- White Mountain National Forest
