= Mount Tecumseh (Alberta) =

Mountain in the country of Canada

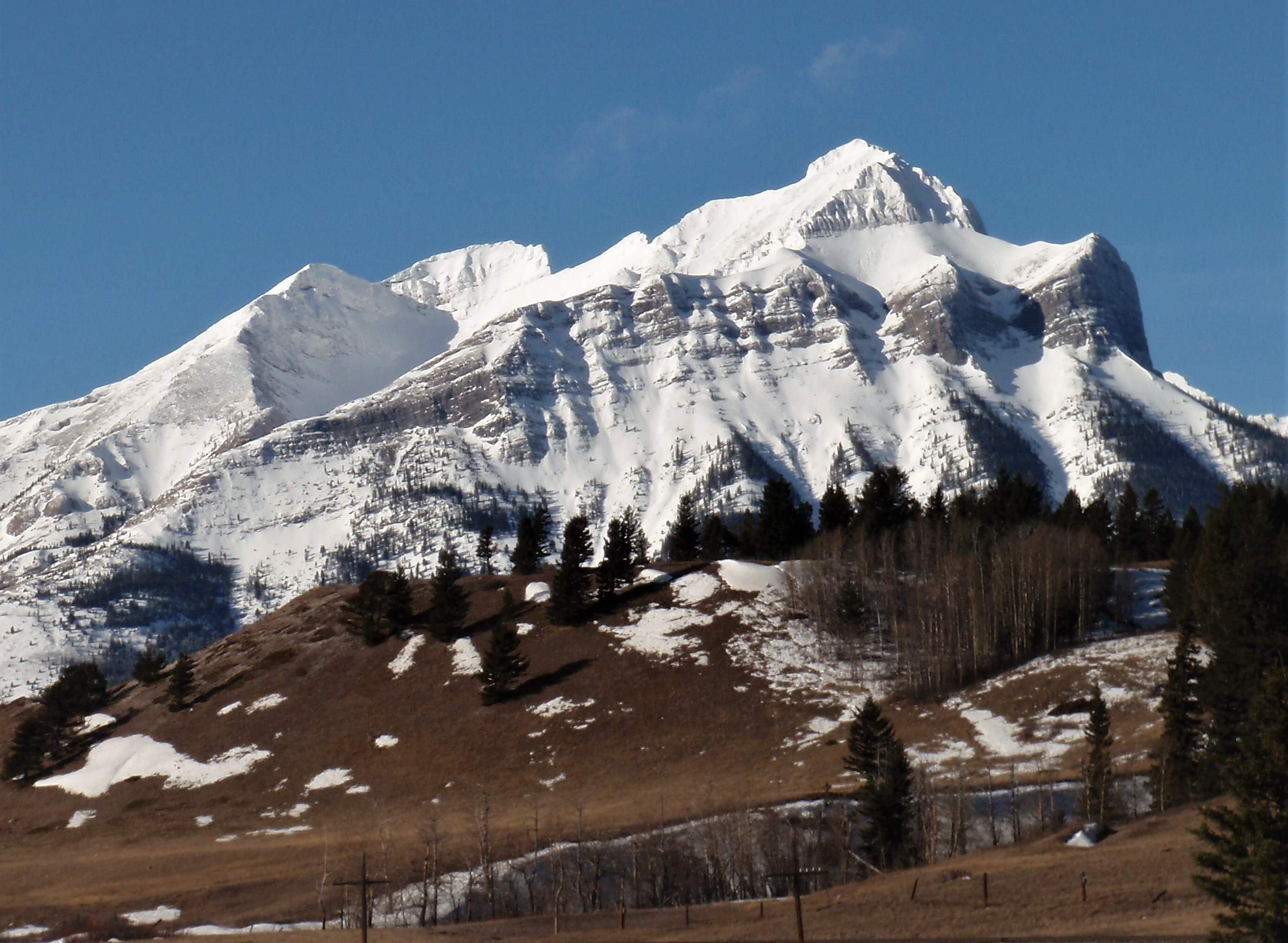
- Mount Tecumseh, southeast aspect

Highest point
- Elevation: 2,547 m (8,356 ft)
- Prominence: 929 m (3,048 ft)
- Parent peak: Crowsnest Mountain (2,785 m)
- Isolation: 6.74 km (4.19 mi)
- Listing: Mountains of Alberta
- Coordinates: 49°39′55″N 114°38′46″W

Naming
- Etymology: Tecumseh

Geography
- Location within Alberta Location within Canada
- Interactive map of Mount Tecumseh
- Location: Alberta, Canada
- Parent range: High Rock Range; Canadian Rockies
- Topo map: NTS 82G10 Crowsnest

Geology
- Mountain type: Fault block
- Rock type: Limestone

Climbing
- Easiest route: Scrambling south slope

Mount Tecumseh is a 2,547-metre-high (8,356 ft) mountain summit located in the Canadian Rockies of Alberta, Canada.

== Description ==
Mount Tecumseh is an iconic landmark situated 10 kilometres (6.2 mi) west of the town of Coleman in the Crowsnest Pass area and can be seen from Highway 3, the Crowsnest Highway. The mountain anchors the southern end of the High Rock Range and precipitation runoff from the mountain drains into tributaries of the nearby Crowsnest River. Topographic relief is significant as the summit rises nearly 1,200 metres (3,900 ft) above Crowsnest Lake in three kilometres (1.9 mi). The summit of Mt. Tecumseh lies one kilometre (0.62 mi) east of the Continental Divide, and the mountain's slightly lower peak, named Phillipps Peak (2,506 metres [8,222 ft]), lies directly on the divide above both Crowsnest Pass and Phillipps Pass. The nearest higher neighbor is Crowsnest Mountain, 6.74 kilometres (4.19 mi) to the northeast.

== History ==
Mount Tecumseh was named to honor Tecumseh (1768–1813), a Shawnee chief and warrior who became an iconic folk hero in American, Indigenous, and Canadian popular history. The meaning of "Tecumseh" translates as "Shooting Star." The mountain's toponym was officially adopted in 1957 by the Geographical Names Board of Canada. Phillipps Peak is named after Michael Phillipps who in 1873 was the first white man to cross Crowsnest Pass.

== Geology ==
Mount Tecumseh is composed of sedimentary rock laid down during the Precambrian to Jurassic periods. Formed in shallow seas, this sedimentary rock was initially uplifted beginning 170 million years ago when the Lewis Overthrust fault pushed an enormous slab of precambrian rocks three miles (4.8 km) thick, 50 miles (80 km) wide and 160 miles (260 km) long over younger rock of the cretaceous period during the Laramide orogeny.

== Climate ==
Based on the Köppen climate classification, Mount Tecumseh has an alpine subarctic climate with cold, snowy winters, and mild summers. Temperatures can drop below −20 °C with wind chill factors below −30 °C.

== Gallery ==
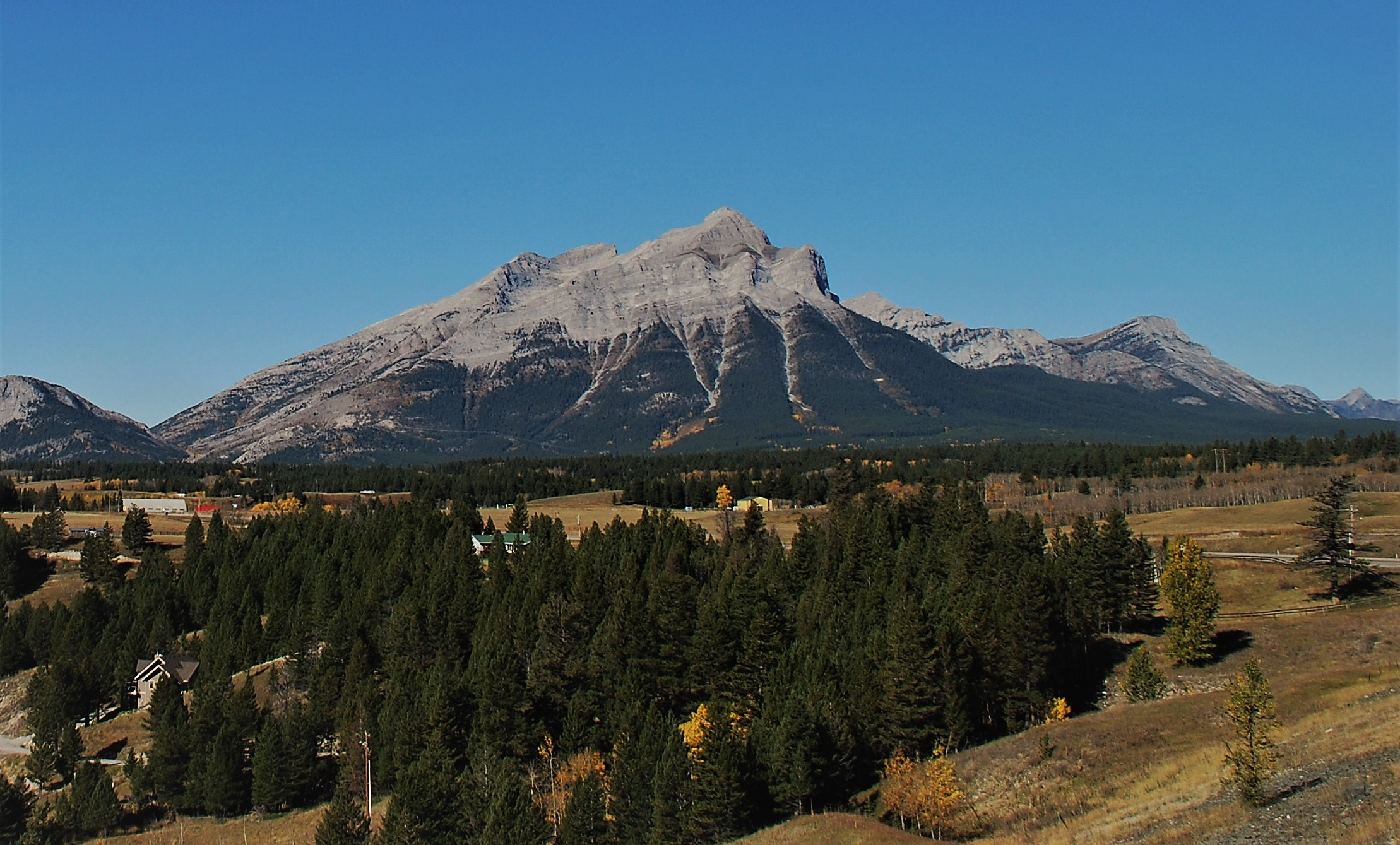
East-southeast aspect

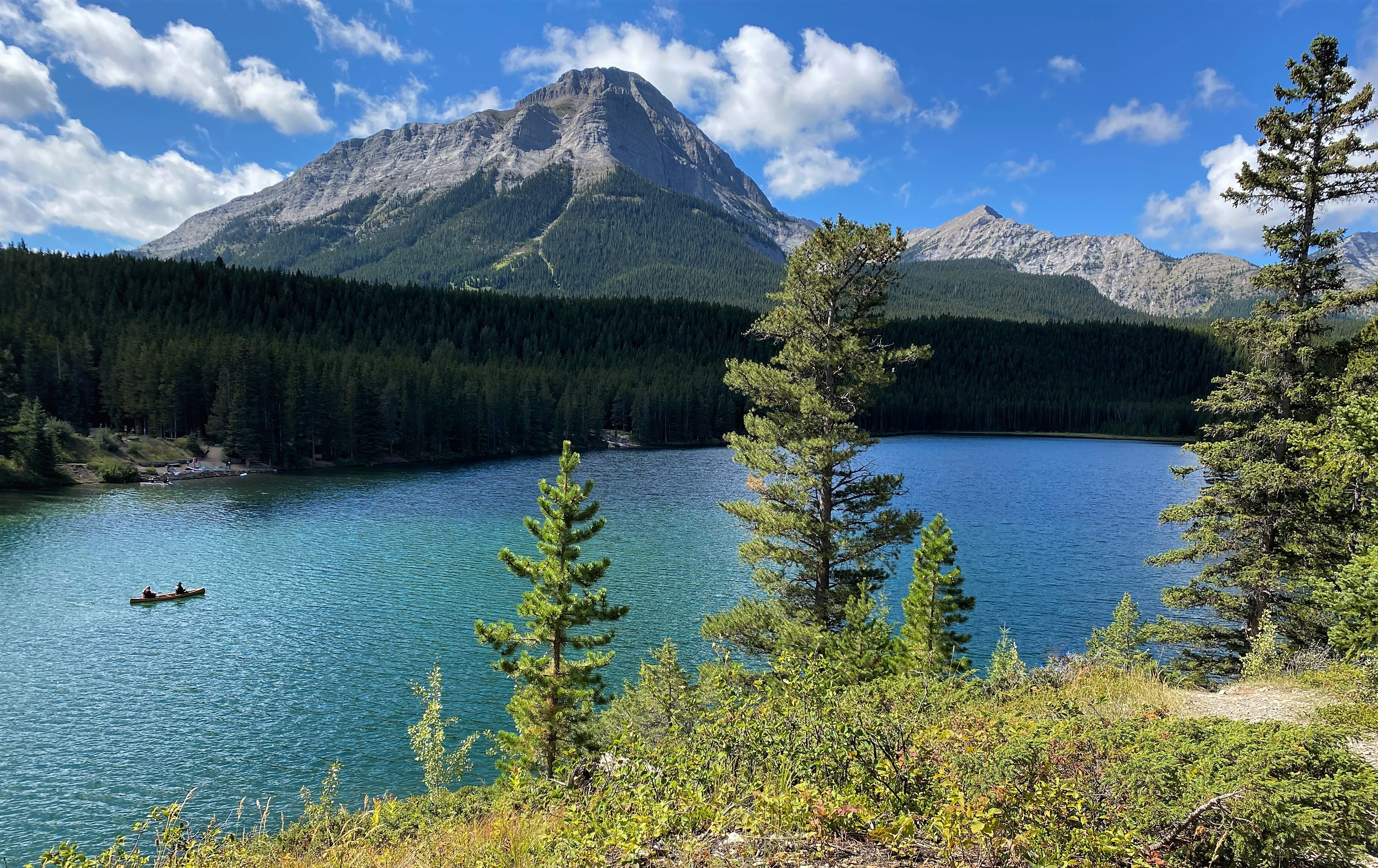
Northeast slope of Mt. Tecumseh from Chinook Lake (aka Allison Lake)

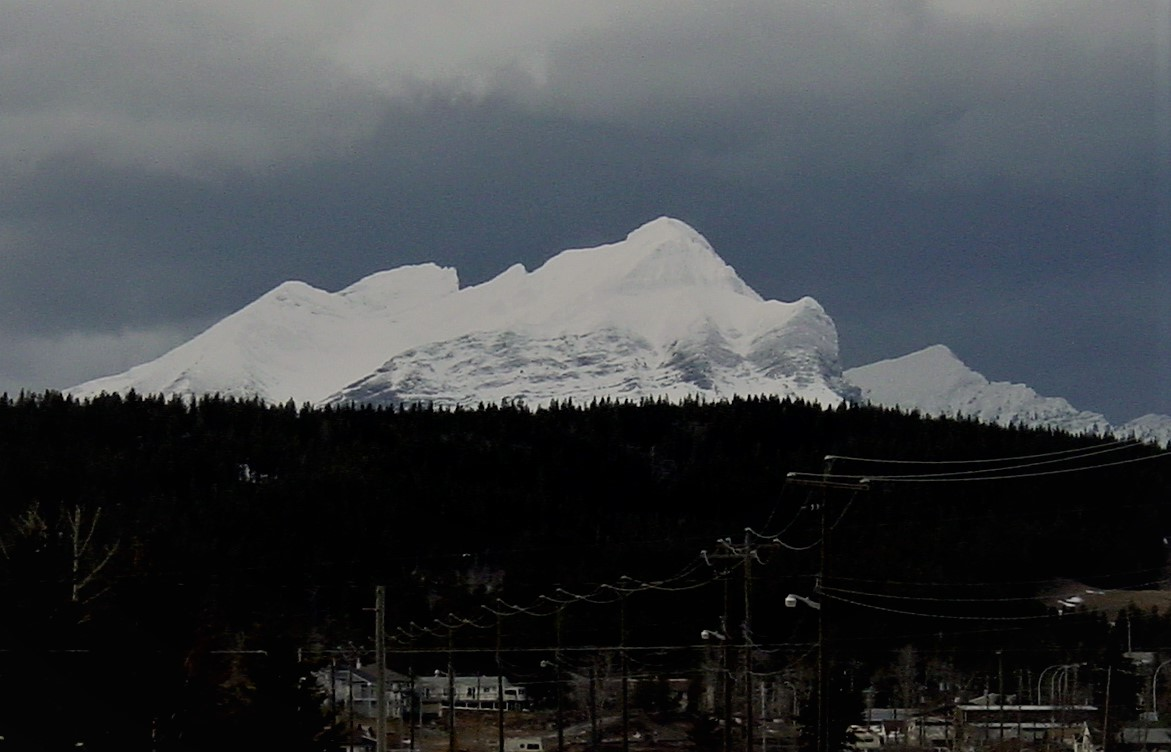
Mount Tecumseh in winter

== See also ==
- Geology of Alberta
- List of memorials to Tecumseh
