= Twelve Points Historic District =

Historic district in Indiana, United States

- U.S. National Register of Historic Places
- U.S. Historic district
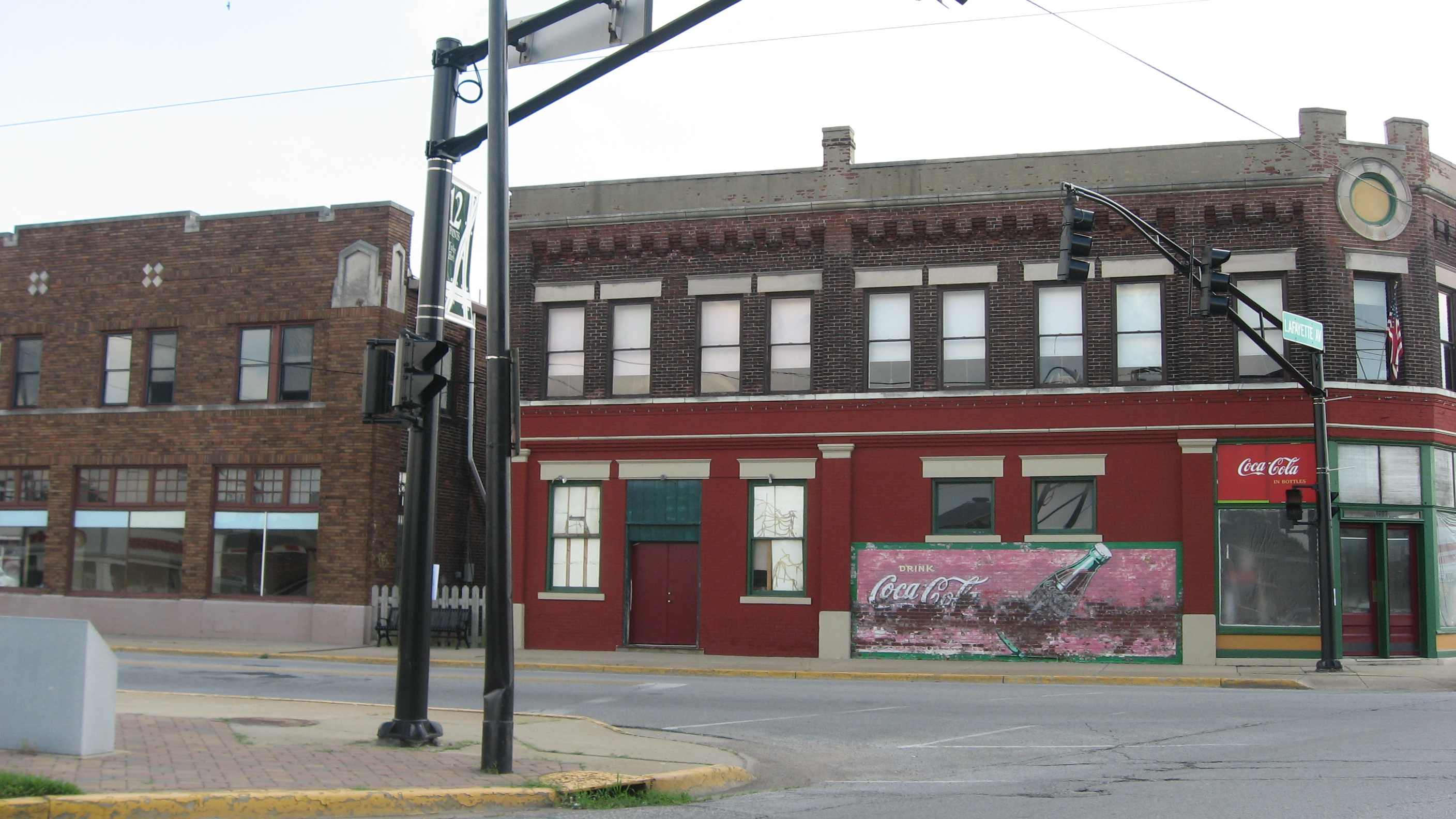
- Twelve Points Historic District, July 2011

- Location within Vigo County, Indiana Location within Indiana Location within the United States
- Location: Lafayette Ave. from Linden to 13th st. and Maple Ave. from Garfield to 13th St., Terre Haute, Indiana
- Coordinates: 39°29′31″N 87°23′56″W
- Area: 11.5 acres (4.7 ha)
- Architect: Shourds-Stoner
- Architectural style: Early Commercial, Art Deco, et al.
- NRHP reference No.: 05000314
- Added to NRHP: April 20, 2005

Twelve Points Historic District is a national historic district located at Terre Haute, Indiana. It encompasses 12 contributing buildings in a suburban commercial district of Terre Haute. It developed between about 1905 and 1954, with most built between 1890 and 1920, and includes representative examples of Commercial, Art Deco, and Classical Revival style architecture. Notable buildings include the Twelve Points State Bank (1919), People State Bank (1923), Twelve Points Hotel (1908), and Garfield Theater / Harmony Hall (1939).

It was listed on the National Register of Historic Places in 2005.
