= Oldtown, Ohio =

Unincorporated community in Ohio, U.S.

Coordinates: 39°43′49″N 83°56′16″W

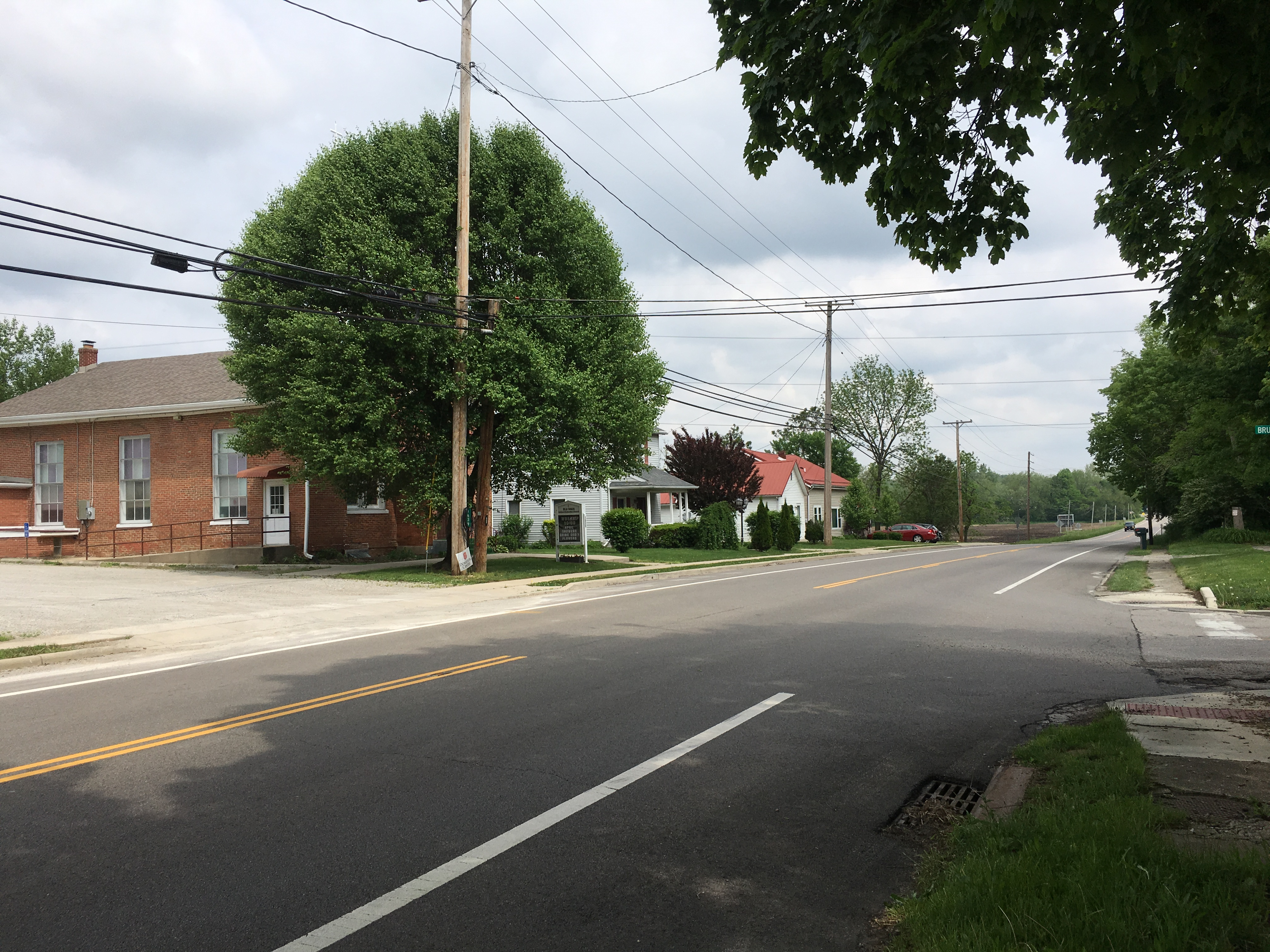
Oldtown, Ohio, looking north on U.S. Route 68, May 2018

Oldtown is an unincorporated community in Xenia Township, Greene County, in the U.S. state of Ohio.

== History ==
Oldtown was founded on a site which had been home to one of Ohio's largest Shawnee settlements.

White settlers first called the place Old Chillicothe, and under the latter name was it platted in 1839. A post office called Old Town was established in 1886, and remained in operation until 1902.

The Great Council State Park, with a mission of educating the public about Tecumseh and the Shawnee, opened in Oldtown on June 7, 2024.
