= Vigo County School Corporation =

School district in Indiana

Vigo County School Corporation (VCSC)

Location
- Terre Haute, Indiana; United States
- Coordinates: 39.4592398°N 87.4474701°W

District information
- Type: Public
- Motto: Developing Leaders. Creating Community.
- Superintendent: Dr. Chris Himsel
- Enrollment: 13,787

Other information
- Website: www.vigoschools.org

Vigo County School Corporation (VCSC) is a school district that serves Vigo County, Indiana and is headquartered in West Terre Haute. The corporation is led by Superintendent Dr. Chris Himsel and by the Board of Trustees including: President Carey LaBella, Vice President; Stacy Killion, Secretary; Christina Crist and members Rick Burger, Amy Lore, James D. Skelton and Ken Warner. The school board holds meetings two times a month on Mondays.

The VCSC contains one building that was once a church on the National Register of Historic Places, the Woodrow Wilson Middle School building known for its Tudor Revival architecture and large-scale interior murals by Gilbert Brown Wilson.

All enrollment data is accurate for the 2020–2021 school year from the Indiana Department of Education.

The school district's boundaries parallel those of Vigo County.

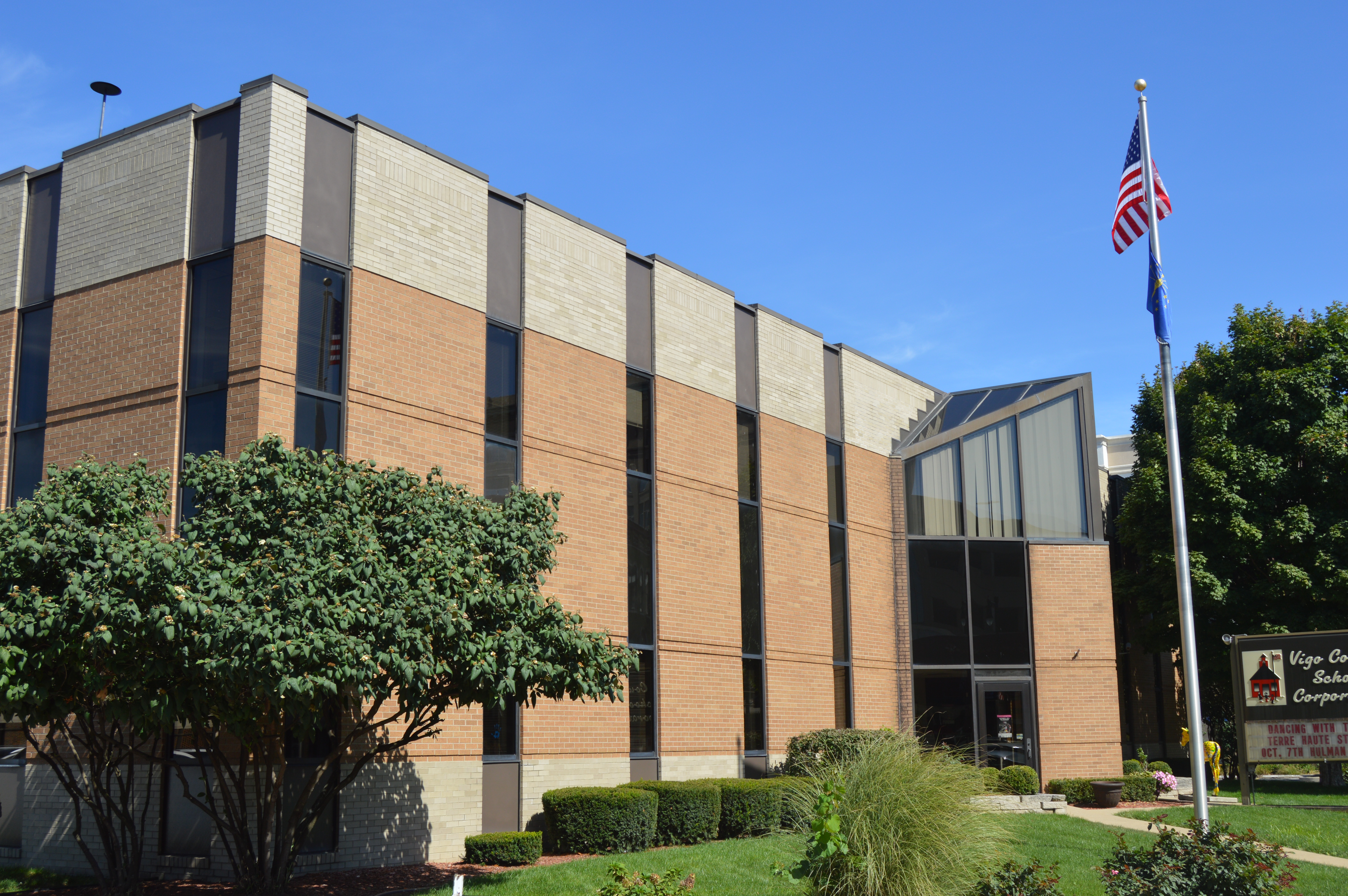
Former offices in downtown Terre Haute

== Enrollment history ==
Vigo County School Corporation Enrollment
Year	Enrollment (# of Students)
2023	13,787
2022	13,940
2021	13,674
2020	14,642
2019	14,722
2018	14,503
2017	14,689
2016	15,140
2015	15,409
2014	15,573

== Graduation rate ==
Vigo County School Corporation Graduation Rate
Year	Graduation Rate
2023	-
2022	78.44%
2021	76.60%
2020	84.27%
2019	83.25%
2018	85.77%
2017	88.74%
2016	90.60%
2015	91.80%
2014	93.40%

== High schools ==
School	Type	Enrollment	Mascot	Colors	IHSAA Class	Athletic Conference
Terre Haute North	Public; 9–12	1432	Patriots		AAAAA	CI
Terre Haute South	Public; 9–12	1463	Braves		AAAAA	CI
West Vigo	Public; 9–12	518	Vikings		AAA	WIC

== Middle Schools ==
- Honey Creek Middle
- Otter Creek Middle
- Sarah Scott Middle
- West Vigo Middle
- Woodrow Wilson Middle

== Elementary ==
- Benjamin Franklin Elementary
- Davis Park Elementary
- DeVaney Elementary
- Dixie Bee Elementary
- Farrington Grove Elementary
- Fayette Elementary
- Fuqua Elementary
- Hoosier Prairie Elementary
- Lost Creek Elementary
- Ouabache Elementary
- Riley Elementary
- Rio Grande Elementary
- Sugar Creek Consolidated Elementary
- Sugar Grove Elementary
- Terre Town Elementary

== Alternative Education ==
- Booker T. Washington High School
