= 2011 Dayton Dutch Lions season =

Dayton Dutch Lions
2011 season
- Owners: (Netherlands) Erik Tammer (Netherlands) Mike Mossel
- Head coach: (Netherlands) Ivar van Dinteren
- Stadium: Miami Valley South Stadium
- USL Pro: Division: 6th Overall: 12th
- Playoffs: Did not qualify
- U.S. Open Cup: First Round
- Highest home attendance: 1,044 vs Charleston (16 April 2011)
- Lowest home attendance: 262 vs Harrisburg (27 July 2011)
- Average home league attendance: 560
Home colors	Away colors

The 2011 Dayton Dutch Lions season was the club's second season of existence, and their first season in USL Pro, the third division of American soccer.

== Background ==
The Dutch Lions' inaugural season was spent playing in the Premier Development League, the fourth-tier of the American soccer pyramid. During their campaign, the Lions finished in third place in the Great Lakes Division and in the Central Conference.

In spite of their third-place finish, the Dutch Lions' 29 points and 8-3-5 record was not enough to qualify for the PDL Playoffs, falling short to Forest City London by six points.

== Roster ==
=== First team ===
As of June 26, 2011

Note: Flags indicate national team as defined under FIFA eligibility rules; some limited exceptions apply. Players may hold more than one non-FIFA nationality.

No.	Pos.	Nation	Player
1	GK	USA	Brian Visser
2	MF	USA	Shane Smith
3	DF	USA	Kyle Segebart
4	DF	ENG	Joe Tait
5	DF	BAH	Happy Hall
6	FW	USA	Kolby LaCrone
7	FW	NED	Lucien Seymour
8	MF	USA	Joel DeLass
9	MF	CZE	Martin Šrámek
10	MF	USA	Sam Shaffer
12	MF	USA	Eric Kissinger

No.	Pos.	Nation	Player
13	DF	AUT	Mettin Copier
14	MF	USA	Jake Slemker
15	DF	NED	Dick van Eijmeren
16	MF	USA	Bret Jones
17	MF	ENG	Luke Magill
19	GK	NED	Jesper Leerdam
21	MF	NED	Marvin van der Pluijm
22	FW	USA	George Davis IV
23	MF	NED	Julius Wille
24	MF	CAN	Mikael McNamara
66	DF	USA	Evan Schwartz

== Club ==
=== Management ===
- (Netherlands) Ivar van Dinteren - Head Coach
- (Netherlands) Jack Hermans - Assistant Coach
- (Netherlands) Cor van Hoeven - Technical Director
- (United States) Zach Huffman - General Manager (USA)
- Warner van Hattem - General Manager (Netherlands)

== Transfers ==
=== In ===
#	Date	Player	Pos.	Previous club	Transfer type	Fee/notes	Ref.
66	January 4, 2011	(United States) Evan Schwartz	DF	(Iceland) Kopavogur	Undisclosed	Undisclosed transfer fee.
13	January 28, 2011	(Austria) Mettin Copier	DF	(Netherlands) Oss	Undisclosed	Undisclosed transfer fee.
6	January 28, 2011	(United States) Kolby LaCrone	FW	(United States) Louisville Lightning	Free	Contract with Louisville expired, free transfer.
5	March 7, 2011	(The Bahamas) Happy Hall	DF	(Trinidad and Tobago) Ma Pau	Free	Contract with Ma Pau expired, free transfer.
19	March 7, 2011	(Netherlands) Jesper Leerdam	GK	(Netherlands) vv Capelle	Free	Contract with Capelle expired, free transfer.

=== Out ===
#	Date	Player	Pos.	Destination club	Transfer type	Fee/notes	Ref.
9	September 15, 2010	(Netherlands) Bas Ent	MF	(Canada) Toronto	Free	Contract expired, did not renew
15	December 6, 2010	(Netherlands) Oscar Moens	FW	(Netherlands) Sparta Rotterdam	Free	Contract termination
13	January 31, 2011	(Netherlands) Ivar van Dinteren	MF		Retired	Retired, subsequently became head coach.
1		(Canada) Stephen Boehmer	GK		Released	Released by the club.
2		(United States) Jeff Popella	FW		Released	Released by the club.
4		(Netherlands) Bruce Godvliet	DF		Released	Released by the club.
5		(United States) Randy Dennis	DF		Released	Released by the club.
8		(Netherlands) Eddie Hertsenberg	MF		Released	Released by the club.
10		(United States) Steven McCarthy	FW		Released	Released by the club.
12		(United States) Kyle Vondenbenken	FW		Released	Released by the club.
14		(Netherlands) Johan Wigger	DF		Released	Released by the club.
17		(United States) Eric Kissinger	MF		Released	Released by the club.
19		(Netherlands) Joel Silooy	MF		Released	Released by the club.
21		(Italy) Andrew Giallombardo	MF		Released	Released by the club.
23		(United States) Judson McKinney	FW		Released	Released by the club.

== Standings ==
National Division

Pos	Team	Pld	W	T	L	GF	GA	GD	Pts	Qualification
1	Rochester Rhinos (A)	24	12	4	8	31	23	+8	40	2011 USL Pro Playoffs (Note: The top four clubs in each division are guaranteed spots in the 2011 USL PRO Playoffs.)
2	Harrisburg City Islanders (A)	24	10	7	7	37	30	+7	37	2011 USL Pro Playoffs
3	Los Angeles Blues (A)	24	8	9	7	34	29	+5	33	2011 USL Pro Playoffs
4	Pittsburgh Riverhounds (A)	24	7	6	11	23	32	−9	27	2011 USL Pro Playoffs
5	F.C. New York	24	6	7	11	27	37	−10	25	
6	Dayton Dutch Lions	24	2	6	16	21	54	−33	12	

Source: USL Pro official standings
Rules for classification: Points, then tiebreak: 1) Head-to-head record based on total points in League games, 2) Total wins in League games, 3) Goal difference in League games, 4) Goals scored in League games, etc.
(A) Advances to USL Pro Playoffs

== Match results ==
=== USL Pro ===
April 16, 2011 Matchday 1	Dayton Dutch Lions	1–2	Charleston Battery	Bellbrook, Ohio
19:30 EDT	LaCrone 65'	Report	Taylor (yellow card) 39'; Paterson 46'; Falvey 58'	Stadium: Miami Valley South Stadium; Attendance: 1,044; Referee: Britton Maier

April 23, 2011 Matchday 2	Dayton Dutch Lions	2–3	Rochester Rhinos	Bellbrook, Ohio
19:30 EDT	Davis 8' van der Pluijm (yellow card) 25'; Magill (yellow card) 50'; Roberts (yellow card) 72'; Segebart 88'	Report	Motagalvan 13'; Banks 45'; Kirk (yellow card) 49'; Tanke (yellow card) 50'; Hamilton 69'	Stadium: Miami Valley South Stadium; Attendance: 625; Referee: Sandio Basu

April 30, 2011 Matchday 3	Dayton Dutch Lions	0–6	Richmond Kickers	Bellbrook, Ohio
19:30 EDT	Copier (yellow card) 12'; Magill (yellow card) 17'; Leerdam (red card) 68'	Report	Delicâte 5'; Elcock 32'; Heins 60'; Bulow 66', 70'; Bangura (yellow card) 83' (goal) 85'	Stadium: Miami Valley South Stadium; Attendance: 600; Referee: Josh Brocks

May 7, 2011 Matchday 4	Dayton Dutch Lions	0–1	Orlando City	Bellbrook, Ohio
19:30 EDT	Tait (yellow card) 20'; Davis (yellow card) 66'; Visser (red card) 85'	Report	Griffin 28' (yellow card) 55'; Bernard (yellow card) 31'	Stadium: Miami Valley South Stadium; Referee: Brandon Rinkenberger

May 20, 2011 Matchday 5	Dayton Dutch Lions	1–1	Los Angeles Blues	Bellbrook, Ohio
19:30 EDT	Hall (yellow card) 50'; LaCrone 60'; Davis (yellow card) 67'; McNamara (yellow card) 89'	Report	Bravo 6'	Stadium: Miami Valley South Stadium; Attendance: 450; Referee: Aaron Hernandez

May 28, 2011 Matchday 6	Dayton Dutch Lions	1–1	Charlotte Eagles	Bellbrook, Ohio
20:00 EDT	LaCrone (yellow card) 42'; Wille 62'; Copier (yellow card) 68'	Report	Bundu 10'; Herrera (yellow card) 49'; Sanchez (yellow card) 74'; Ferrara (yellow card) 90'	Stadium: Miami Valley South Stadium

June 4, 2011 Matchday 7	Dayton Dutch Lions	2–1	Pittsburgh Riverhounds	Bellbrook, Ohio
19:30 EDT	Copier (yellow card) 44'; Davis 74', 79' van der Pluijm (yellow card) 89'	Report	Yeisley 37'; Katic (yellow card) 90'	Stadium: Miami Valley South Stadium; Attendance: 500

=== U.S. Open Cup ===
June 14, 2011 R1	Richmond Kickers (Virginia)	4–1	(Ohio) Dayton Dutch Lions	Richmond, Virginia
17:00 EDT	Bulow 7' 17' 65' (pen.); Bangura 90'	Report	van der Pluijm 59'	Stadium: City Stadium; Referee: Andrew Chapin

== Statistics ==
=== Appearances and goals ===
Last updated on 26 January 2011.

No.	Pos	Nat	Player	Total		USL Pro		U.S. Open Cup		Preseason	
No.	Pos	Nat	Player	Apps	Goals	Apps	Goals	Apps	Goals	Apps	Goals
1	GK	(Canada) CAN	Steven Boehmer	0	0	0+0	0	0+0	0	0+0	0
2	FW	(United States) USA	Jeff Popella	0	0	0+0	0	0+0	0	0+0	0
3	DF	(United States) USA	Kyle Segebart	0	0	0+0	0	0+0	0	0+0	0
4	DF	(Netherlands) NED	Bruce Godvliet	0	0	0+0	0	0+0	0	0+0	0
5	DF	(United States) USA	Rnady Dennis	0	0	0+0	0	0+0	0	0+0	0
6	DF	(United States) USA	Evan Schwartz	0	0	0+0	0	0+0	0	0+0	0
8	MF	(Netherlands) NED	Eddie Hertsenberg	0	0	0+0	0	0+0	0	0+0	0
10	FW	(United States) USA	Steven McCarthy	0	0	0+0	0	0+0	0	0+0	0
12	DF	(Germany) GER	Kyle Vondenbenken	0	0	0+0	0	0+0	0	0+0	0
13	MF	(Netherlands) NED	Ivan van Dinteren	0	0	0+0	0	0+0	0	0+0	0
14	DF	(Netherlands) NED	Johan Wigger	0	0	0+0	0	0+0	0	0+0	0
16	DF	(United States) USA	Brett Jones	0	0	0+0	0	0+0	0	0+0	0
17	MF	(United States) USA	Eric Kissinger	0	0	0+0	0	0+0	0	0+0	0
19	MF	(Netherlands) NED	Joel Silooy	0	0	0+0	0	0+0	0	0+0	0
21	MF	(Italy) ITA	Andrew Giallombardo	0	0	0+0	0	0+0	0	0+0	0
22	FW	(United States) USA	George Davis IV	0	0	0+0	0	0+0	0	0+0	0
23	FW	(United States) USA	Judson McKinney	0	0	0+0	0	0+0	0	0+0	0
24	MF	(Netherlands) NED	Alex van der Sluijs	0	0	0+0	0	0+0	0	0+0	0
