= 2011 Richmond Kickers season =

Richmond Kickers
2011 season
- Owner: Rob Ukrop
- Head coach: Leigh Cowlishaw
- Stadium: City Stadium
- Regular Season: Conference: 3rd Overall: 3rd
- Playoffs: Divisional Finals
- U.S. Open Cup: Semifinals
- Highest home attendance: 4,742 vs Dayton Dutch Lions 6 August 2011
- Lowest home attendance: 743 vs Charlotte Eagles 8 July 2011
- Average home league attendance: 1,735
Home colors	Away colors

The 2011 Richmond Kickers season was the Kickers' nineteenth season in existence and their inaugural campaign in the third-tier USL Pro League. Beforehand, the Kickers played in the USL Second Division. Overall, it was the Kickers' sixth-consecutive season playing in the third division of American soccer.

The Kickers had a successful campaign in USL Pro, having the third best overall record in the league. In the playoffs, the Kickers were eliminated by eventual USL Pro Champions, Orlando City S.C. in the division finals. Outside of USL, the Kickers reached the semifinals of the U.S. Open Cup, their deepest run in the domestic tournament since 1995. During their campaign, the Kickers knocked off two MLS sides, the Columbus Crew in the third round, and Sporting Kansas City in the quarterfinals.

== Roster ==
=== First team ===
No.	Pos	Nat	Player	Total		Regular Season		Playoffs		U.S. Open Cup	
No.	Pos	Nat	Player	Apps	Goals	Apps	Goals	Apps	Goals	Apps	Goals
1	GK	(England) ENG	Ryan Jones	1	0	1	0	0	0	0	0
2	DF	(Cameroon) CMR	William Yomby	31	3	24	2	2	0	5	1
3	DF	(United States) USA	Jamel Wallace	22	0	16	0	2	0	4	0
4	MF	(United States) USA	Luke Vercollone	31	1	24	1	2	0	5	0
5	MF	(United States) USA	Ryan Heins	28	4	23	4	2	0	3	0
7	FW	(England) ENG	Matthew Delicâte	29	13	24	10	2	0	3	3
8	MF	(Brazil) BRA	Gerson dos Santos	19	2	16	2	2	0	1	0
9	MF	(Japan) JPN	Nozomi Hiroyama	25	1	20	0	2	0	3	1
10	FW	(United States) USA	David Bulow	30	10	24	4	2	0	4	6
11	FW	(United States) USA	Edson Elcock	29	4	22	4	2	0	5	0

== Standings ==
Final standings for the 2011 USL Pro season.

=== American Division ===
Pos	Team	Pld	W	T	L	GF	GA	GD	Pts	Qualification
1	Orlando City SC (C)	24	15	6	3	36	16	+20	51	2011 USL Pro Commissioner's Cup, 2011 USL Pro Playoffs
2	Wilmington Hammerheads (A)	24	14	3	7	42	30	+12	45	2011 USL Pro Playoffs (Note: The top four clubs in each division are guaranteed spots in the 2011 USL Pro Playoffs.)
3	Richmond Kickers (A)	24	12	5	7	35	21	+14	41	2011 USL Pro Playoffs
4	Charleston Battery (A)	24	10	5	9	24	25	−1	35	2011 USL Pro Playoffs
5	Charlotte Eagles	24	9	6	9	32	29	+3	33	
6	Antigua Barracuda	24	9	2	13	32	32	0	29	

Source: USL Pro official standings
Rules for classification: Points, then tiebreak: 1) Head-to-head record based on total points in League games, 2) Total wins in League games, 3) Goal difference in League games, 4) Goals scored in League games, etc.
(A) Advances to USL Pro Playoffs; (C) Commissioner's Cup (best regular season record)

== Match results ==
=== USL Pro ===
Home team is listed on the left.

Regular Season

April 2, 2011 1	Richmond Kickers	2–0	Orlando City	Richmond, VA
16:00 EDT	Nyzazamba 39' (pen.); Kalungi 45'; Delicâte 83'	Report		Stadium: City Stadium; Attendance: 1,650; Referee: Mark Gorak

April 9, 2011 2	Richmond Kickers	2–1	Pittsburgh Riverhounds	Richmond, VA
18:00 EDT		Report		Stadium: City Stadium; Attendance: 1,385

April 15, 2011 3	Richmond Kickers	1–0	Rochester Rhinos	Richmond, VA
20:05 EDT	Callahan (yellow card) 20'; Delicâte 24'	Report		Stadium: City Stadium; Attendance: 2,049; Referee: Shawn Fitch

April 23, 2011 4	Richmond Kickers	2–1	Charleston Battery	Richmond, VA
17:00 EDT		Report		Stadium: City Stadium; Attendance: 1,833; Referee: Shaun Papperman

April 30, 2011 5	Dayton Dutch Lions	0–6	Richmond Kickers	Bellbrook, OH
19:30 EDT	Copier (yellow card) 12'; Magill (yellow card) 17'; Leerdam (red card) 68'	Report	5' Delicâte; 32' Elcock; 60' Heins; 66', 70' Bulow; (yellow card) 83' (goal) 85' Bangura	Stadium: Miami Valley South Stadium; Attendance: 600; Referee: Josh Brocks

May 7, 2011 6	Richmond Kickers	2–1	Wilmington Hammerheads	Richmond, VA
19:00 EDT	dos Santos 65'; Delicâte 80'	Report	3' Becerra; (yellow card) 44' Mulholland; (yellow card) 90' Parratt	Stadium: City Stadium; Attendance: 2,006; Referee: Mark Gorak

May 14, 2011 7	Harrisburg City Islanders	1–1	Richmond Kickers	Harrisburg, PA
19:00 EDT	Pelletier (yellow card) 11'; Becerra 56' (pen.) (yellow card) 65'; Schofield (yellow card) 69'	Report	(yellow card) 53' Vercollone; (yellow card) 56' Kalungi; (red card) 69' Elcock; 82' Bangura	Stadium: Skyline Sports Complex; Attendance: 1,424; Referee: Ian Bongaardt

May 24, 2011 8	Charleston Battery	2–1	Richmond Kickers	Charleston, SC
19:30 EDT	Kelly 26'; Paterson (yellow card) 68'; Marples (yellow card) 81'; Gruenewald 86'	Report	1' Delicâte	Stadium: Blackbaud Stadium; Attendance: 2,461; Referee: Dan Burak

May 25, 2011 9	Orlando City	2–0	Richmond Kickers	Orlando, FL
19:30 EDT				Stadium: Citrus Bowl

May 28, 2011 10	Richmond Kickers	2–2	F.C. New York	Richmond, VA
19:00 EDT	Heins 37'; Nyazamba 53'	Report	52', 79' Brito	Stadium: City Stadium; Attendance: 2,545; Referee: Jim Sadowski

June 12, 2011 11	F.C. New York	0–2	Richmond Kickers	Queens, NY
19:30 EDT				Stadium: Belson Stadium

June 17, 2011 12	Harrisburg City Islanders	1–0	Richmond Kickers	Harrisburg, PA
19:00 EDT				Stadium: Skyline Sports Complex

June 24, 2011 13	F.C. New York	0–0	Richmond Kickers	Garden City, NY
19:00 EDT		Report		Stadium: Motamed Field

July 1, 2011 14	Richmond Kickers	1–2	Rochester Rhinos
		Report

July 4, 2011 15	Dayton Dutch Lions	1–3	Richmond Kickers
		Report
Note: Rescheduled match following the expunging of Puerto Rican clubs

July 8, 2011 16	Charlotte Eagles	2–1	Richmond Kickers
		Report

July 9, 2011 17	Richmond Kickers	1–2	Charlotte Eagles
Note: Rescheduled match following the expunging of Puerto Rican clubs

July 16, 2011 18	Richmond Kickers	1–0	Antigua Barracuda
		Report
Note: Rescheduled match following the expunging of Puerto Rican clubs

July 22, 2011 19	Richmond Kickers	1–2	Los Angeles Blues
		Report
Note: Rescheduled match following the expunging of Puerto Rican clubs

July 30, 2011 20	Pittsburgh Riverhounds	2–0	Richmond Kickers
		Report		Attendance: 2,005
Note: Rescheduled match following the expunging of Puerto Rican clubs

August 6, 2011 21	Richmond Kickers	3–0	Dayton Dutch Lions
		Report

August 10, 2011 22	Wilmington Hammerheads	0–2	Richmond Kickers
		Report		Attendance: 3,461

August 12, 2011 23	Los Angeles Blues	0–0	Richmond Kickers
		Report		Attendance: 255

August 14, 2011 24	Los Angeles Blues	0–0	Richmond Kickers
		Report		Attendance: 0
Note: Rescheduled match following the expunging of Puerto Rican clubs

Playoffs

August 19, 2011 Div. Semifinals	Wilmington Hammerheads	0–0 (a.e.t.) (4–5 p)	Richmond Kickers	Wilmington, NC
19:30 EDT	Nicholson (yellow card) 49'; Parratt (yellow card) 99'	Report	(yellow card) 47' Heins; (yellow card) 100' Goerres	Stadium: Legion Field; Attendance: 3,849; Referee: Moo Hackett
	Penalties
	Budnyy (penalty scored); Jata (penalty scored); Barrera (penalty scored); Cuero (penalty scored); Bagley (penalty missed)		(penalty scored) Goerres; (penalty scored) Bulow; (penalty scored) Hiroyama; (penalty scored) Delicate; (penalty scored) Bangura

August 27, 2011 Div. Finals	Orlando City	3–0	Richmond Kickers	Orlando, FL
19:30 EDT	Boden 19'; Jerome 45+2'; Chin 70'	Report	(yellow card) 3' Wallace; (red card) 89' Kalungi	Stadium: Citrus Bowl; Attendance: 8,304; Referee: Andres Pfefferkorn

=== U.S. Open Cup ===
June 14, 2011 First round	Richmond Kickers (Virginia)	4–1	(Ohio) Dayton Dutch Lions	Richmond, Virginia
17:00 EDT	Bulow 7' 17' 65' (pen.); Bangura 90'	Report	van der Pluijm 59'	Stadium: City Stadium; Attendance: 722; Referee: Andrew Chapin

June 21, 2011 Second round	Richmond Kickers (Virginia)	4–1	(Pennsylvania) Pittsburgh Riverhounds	Richmond, Virginia
19:00 EDT	Bulow 17' 41'; Delicâte 52' 81'	Report	Severs 30'	Stadium: City Stadium; Attendance: 1,161; Referee: Jim Sadowski

June 28, 2011 Third round	Columbus Crew (Ohio)	1–2	(Virginia) Richmond Kickers	Columbus, Ohio
19:30 EDT	Grossman 35'	Report	22' Hiroyama; 85' Delicâte	Stadium: Columbus Crew Stadium; Attendance: 1,846

July 12, 2011 Quarterfinals	Sporting Kansas City	0–2	(Virginia) Richmond Kickers	Kansas City, Kansas
20:30 EDT			66' Bangura; 83' (pen.) Bulow	Stadium: Livestrong Sporting Park

August 30, 2011 Semifinals	Chicago Fire (Illinois)	2–1	(Virginia) Richmond Kickers	Bridgeview, Illinois
20:30 EDT	Grazzini 32' (pen.); Oduro 61'	Report	(yellow card) 14' Nyazamba; 68' (yellow card) 77' Yomy	Stadium: Toyota Park; Attendance: 8,909; Referee: Jasen Anno

== See also ==
- Richmond Kickers
- 2011 in American soccer
- 2011 USL Professional Division
- 2011 U.S. Open Cup
