= Berryhill-Morris House =

Historic house in Ohio, United States

- U.S. National Register of Historic Places
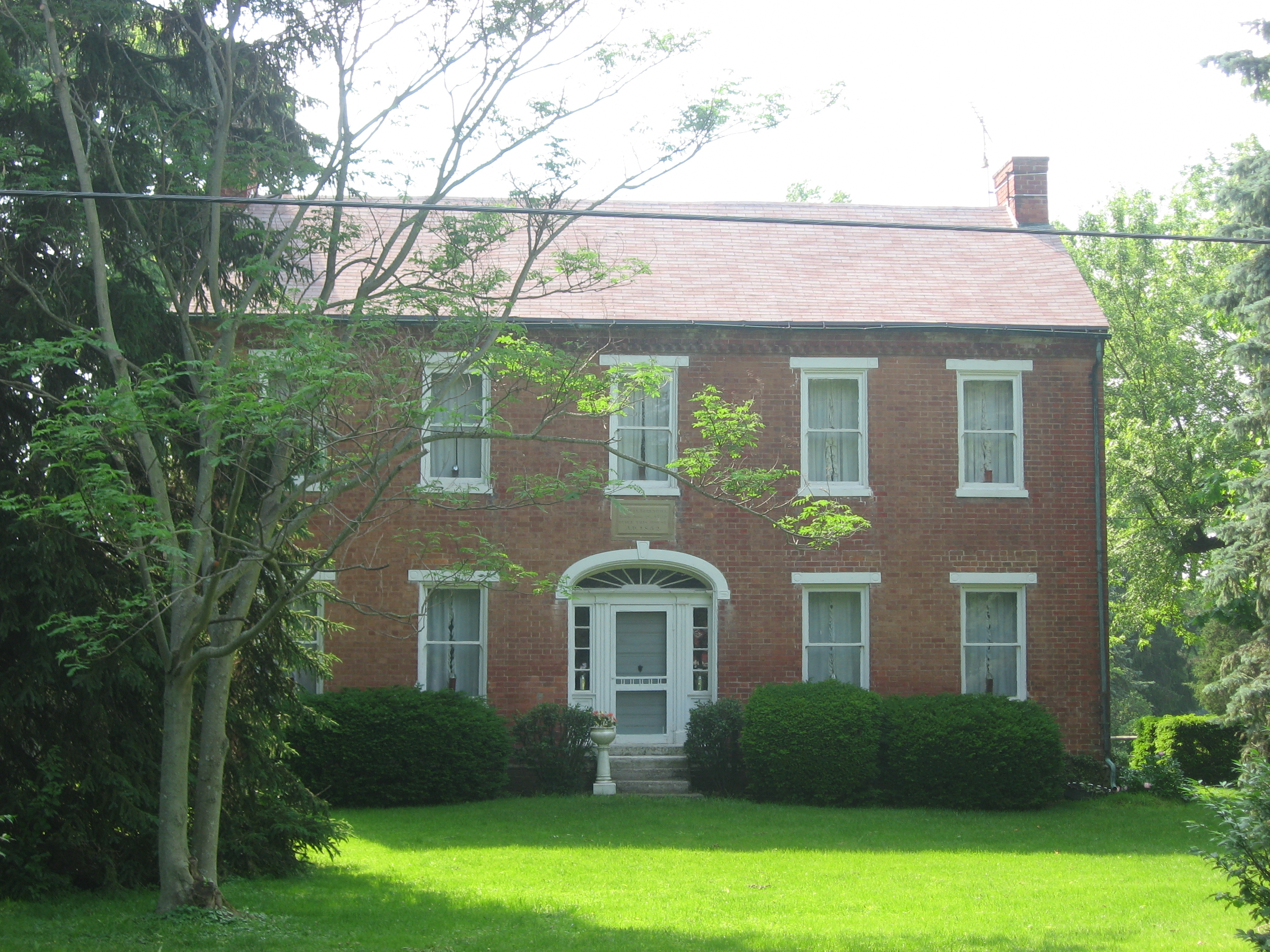
- Front of the house

- Location within Ohio Location within the United States
- Location: 3113 Ferry Road, Sugarcreek Township
- Nearest city: Bellbrook, Ohio
- Coordinates: 39°36′15″N 84°5′14″W
- Area: Less than 1 acre (0.40 ha)
- Built: 1832
- Architectural style: Federal
- NRHP reference No.: 75001407
- Added to NRHP: November 12, 1975

The Berryhill-Morris House is a historic farmhouse near the city of Bellbrook in Greene County, Ohio, United States. Built in the 1830s for an elderly veteran, it has changed little since its early years, and it has been named a historic site.

Berryhills were among the pioneers of Sugarcreek Township, starting when Alexander and Rachel Berryhill moved from Virginia. A great-nephew of Charles Thomson, secretary of the First Continental Congress, Alexander enlisted in the Continental Army at the age of nineteen. Fighting under the command of Nathanael Greene, Berryhill was wounded as his company was captured at the Battle of Guilford Court House. After two years as a prisoner of war, he was released in a prisoner exchange and returned home. Having married, he moved to Ohio in 1814 with his family. He became the patriarch of one of the township's premier old families, composed of eleven children, including a prominent Old School Presbyterian minister. His property was inherited by his son Samuel, who continued farming until dying in 1840. Eighteen years later, the Morris family purchased the property and began a tenure of over a century.

Built in 1832, the Berryhill-Morris House is a two-story building in the Federal style. Both the walls and the foundation are brick, and it possesses an asphalt roof and elements of stone. Its floor plan is that of a rectangular central-passage house, and it sits amid a farm of approximately 100 acres (40 ha) that retains its original rural appearance. In 1975, the house was listed on the National Register of Historic Places. It qualified because of its architecture, which was deemed significant as an example of earlier settlers' efforts to civilize the wilderness of early Ohio.
