= Lapira =

Lapira is a surname. Notable people with the surname include:

- Joseph Lapira (born 1986), American soccer player
- Liza Lapira (born 1981), American actress

== See also ==
- Giorgio La Pira (1904–1977), Italian politician
