= Mount Saint John, Ohio =

Unincorporated community in Ohio, U.S.

Coordinates: 39°43′07″N 84°05′59″W

Mount Saint John is an unincorporated community located in Greene County, Ohio, United States.
