= Ray Shook =

American baseball player (1889–1970)

- Catcher
- Born: November 18, 1889; Ferry, Ohio, U.S.
- Died: September 16, 1970 (aged 80); South Bend, Indiana, U.S.
- Batted: Right Threw: Right

MLB debut
- April 16, 1916, for the Chicago White Sox

Last MLB appearance
- April 16, 1916, for the Chicago White Sox

MLB statistics
- Games played: 1
- At bats: 0
- Hits: 0
- Stats at Baseball Reference

Teams
- Chicago White Sox (1916)

Raymond Curtis Shook (November 18, 1889 – September 16, 1970) was an American Major League Baseball player. He played for the Chicago White Sox in 1916.
