= Washington Mills =

Washington Mills can refer to:

- Washington Mills, New York, an unincorporated hamlet and census-designated place in the Town of New Hartford, New York, United States.
- Washington Mills, Ohio, an unincorporated community
- Washington Mills (building), a former woollen mill redeveloped as residential and live-work housing in Lawrence, Massachusetts, United States.
- Washington Mills, a defunct manufacturer in Lawrence, Massachusetts, United States.
- Washington Mills (company), a manufacturer of abrasive materials and fused mineral products based in North Grafton, Massachusetts, United States.
- Washington Mills Ceramics, a manufacturer of abrasive tumbling media for metal finishing applications, based in Sun Prairie, Wisconsin, United States.
- Washington Mills, a defunct manufacturer of textiles and clothing in Mayodan, North Carolina, United States.
