= Copier (disambiguation) =

A copier or photocopier is a machine for producing paper duplicates of documents and images.

Copier may also refer to:

- Mettin Copier, a footballer currently playing for Dayton Dutch Lions
- Game backup device
- Slide copier, a device for duplicating photographic slides

== See also ==
- List of duplicating processes
