= Leerdam (surname) =

Leerdam is a Dutch surname. Notable people with the surname include:

- Ilja van Leerdam (born 1978), Dutch footballer
- Jesper Leerdam (born 1987), Dutch footballer
- John Leerdam (born 1961), Dutch politician
- Jutta Leerdam (born 1998), Dutch speed skater
- Kelvin Leerdam (born 1990), Surinamese footballer
