= Kenneth Aninkora =

Dutch footballer (born 1998)

Personal information
- Date of birth: 4 October 1998 (age 28)
- Place of birth: Amsterdam, Netherlands
- Position: Forward

Team information
- Current team: FC Breukelen

Youth career
- –2007: SV Diemen
- 2007–2014: Ajax
- 2014–2017: AFC

Senior career*
Years	Team	Apps	(Gls)
2017	AFC		
2017–2020	Jong Almere City	45	(16)
2019–2021	Almere City	4	(0)
2021–2022	DVS '33	22	(6)
2023–2024	DHSC		
2024–2025	Nieuw Utrecht		
2025–	FC Breukelen		
- * Club domestic league appearances and goals as of 20:11, 16 September 2021 (UTC)

Kenneth Aninkora (born 4 October 1998) is a Dutch footballer who plays as a forward for FC Breukelen.

== Career ==
Born in Amsterdam, Aninkora started his career as a youth player at SV Diemen, before joining the academy of AFC Ajax in 2007 and the academy of Amsterdamsche FC in 2014. After making his debut for Amsterdamsche FC in 2017, he joined Almere City in the summer of 2017. After playing in the Derde Divisie and the Tweede Divisie with Jong Almere City, he made his debut for Almere City in March 2019. In May 2019, Aninkora signed his first professional contract with the club. His contract was terminated in January 2021.

In August 2021, he joined DVS '33 on a one-year deal.He moved to FC Breukelen from Nieuw Utrecht in summer 2025.
