= Stringtown, Greene County, Ohio =

Unincorporated community in Ohio, U.S.

Coordinates: 39°41′10″N 83°50′47″W

Stringtown is an unincorporated community in Greene County, in the U.S. state of Ohio.

== History ==
The community was named for the manner in which the houses were strung along the road.
