= Roxanna, Ohio =

Unincorporated community in Ohio, U.S.

Coordinates: 39°34′57″N 84°00′58″W

Roxanna is an unincorporated community in Greene County, in the U.S. state of Ohio.

== History ==
Roxanna was originally called Claysville, and under the latter name was platted in 1845 when the railroad was extended to that point. A post office called Roxanna was established there in 1887, and remained in operation until 1907.
