= Baton Rouge Capitals =

BRSC Capitals
- Full name: Baton Rouge Capitals
- Nicknames: The Capitals, The Caps, The Cult
- Founded: 2007. Reformed in 2021.
- Dissolved: 2011
- Ground: Olympia Stadium; Baton Rouge, Louisiana
- Owner: (United States) John Hamide
- Head Coach: (England) Craig Scott
- League: Gulf Coast Premier League
- Website: brcapitals.com (archived)
| Home colors | Away colors |

BRSC Capitals are an American soccer team based in Baton Rouge, Louisiana, United States. Founded in 2007, the team played in the USL Premier Development League (PDL), the fourth tier of the American Soccer Pyramid, in the Mid South Division of the Southern Conference, before being dissolved in 2011.

In 2021, the team was reformed and placed in the Gulf Coast Premier League.

The team plays its home games in Olympia Stadium. The team's colors are red, white and black.

== History ==
Baton Rouge entered its first ever soccer franchise into the PDL in 2007, under the leadership of Bo Cassidy, a veteran coach and collegiate player at UMass Amherst. The Capitals started their inaugural season with three straight defeats, failing to pick up their first win until the fourth game of the season, 1–0 over fellow new boys Mississippi Brilla. The rest of the season followed a similar pattern: a sequence of defeats, followed by an impressive victory which seemed to signal a turn in fortune, only for the defeats to continue. Their highlight was a superb see-saw 3–2 win over the experience El Paso Patriots that featured a brace by striker Tony Judice, but their inconsistency eventually left them in sixth place in standings, 15 points behind divisional champions Laredo Heat. Judice was the Capitals' top scorer, notching 5 goals; Irish international striker Joseph Lapira also made a valuable contribution, with 3 goals and 1 assist to his name.

The Capitals changed coaches during the offseason, bringing in local Brazilian-born coach Helio d'Anna, but his introduction failed to have the desired effect, as the team again suffered from raging inconsistency, especially away from home. They actually won their opening game of the 2008 campaign, 2–0 over the El Paso Patriots off a pair of goals by Tony Judice, but immediately slumped to three successive defeats in their next three games. They won the first half of the Louisiana derby, 4–1 at home over the New Orleans Shell Shockers, and enjoyed a brief run of form at the beginning of June, knocking off Houston Leones and Mississippi Brilla in quick succession, but rapidly reverted to their old ways; they didn't win another game that month, suffering a trio of 3-goal defeats, and were eliminated from playoff contention with several games remaining in the season. They did manage to do the double over their state rivals, beating New Orleans 3–2 in the return fixture in the Big Easy with two goals from Leonardo dos Barros, but eventually finished the year a distant fifth in the Mid South, 9 points adrift of divisional champions Austin Aztex U23. Leonardo dos Barros was Baton Rouge's top scorer, with 7 goals, while Ricardo Santos contributed three assists.

The club was acquired by new owner John Hamide in the fall of 2009, with Ben Callon Overseeing all coaching, playing hires and operations; defender Stuart Hayers was appointed as Head Coach by Ben Callon officially on January 20, 2010.

Hayers and Callon immediately built an entirely new team retaining only Josey Portillo and Jared Wooley from the previous season's squad and enjoyed the most successful season in their history, eventually finishing in third place in the PDL National Championship. Capitals swept Louisiana rivals New Orleans Jesters, winning 2–1, 2–1, and 3–2 respectively, after former Jester Ben Callon scored two goals within the first three minutes in the first match, at Olympia stadium. However, the eventual Divisional Champions Mississippi Brilla were the only team Capitals were unable to beat. Capitals finished as runners-up with 30 points and a 9–2–3 regular-season record. Capitals' biggest win came in a 5–1 home victory over Atlanta Blackhawks, defender Joe Tait scoring the club's only hat-trick of the season. Baton Rouge Capitals went through to the 2010 PDL National Championships after winning both their play-off games, beating Laredo Heat (6–5 on penalties after a 1–1 tie) and Houston Leones (2–1) in searing temperatures in Jackson Mississippi, to win the PDL Southern Conference. However, the best run in the club's history ended with a 2–1 semi-final defeat to Thunder Bay Chill (Ontario) despite having gone ahead late in the second half. Capitals ended their season on a winning note, however, beating Reading United AC 4–2 on penalties after a 2–2 tie; the winning penalty coming from Capitals' leading goal-scorer Ben Callon (12 goals and 6 assists) after two fine saves from Capitals' goalkeeper Joe Hart. Callon was also selected for the PDL Southern Conference team of the year along with defender Joe Tait, who was also awarded PDL Defender of the Season, making the PDL National All Stars.

The team folded after completion of the 2011 season.

== Notable former players ==
This list of notable former players comprises players who went on to play professional soccer after playing for the team in the Premier Development League, or those who previously played professionally before joining the team.

- (England) Ben Callon]* (England) Mark Anderson
- (France) Achille Campion
- (United States) Scott Gordon
- (United States) (Republic of Ireland) Joseph Lapira
- (Brazil) Felipe Nogueira
- (England) Luke Magill
- (United States) Patrick Mullins
- (United States) Justin Portillo
- (United States) Anthony Peters
- (Puerto Rico) Alessandro Salvatore
- (England) Joe Tait

== Year-by-year ==
| Year | Division | League | Regular season | Playoffs | Open Cup |
|---|---|---|---|---|---|
| 2007 | 4 | USL PDL | 6th, Mid South | Did not qualify | Did not qualify |
| 2008 | 4 | USL PDL | 5th, Mid South | Did not qualify | Did not qualify |
| 2009 | 4 | USL PDL | 5th, Southeast | Did not qualify | Did not qualify |
| 2010 | 4 | USL PDL | 2nd, Southeast | National Semifinals | Did not qualify |
| 2011 | 4 | USL PDL | 3rd, Mid South | Did not qualify | Did not qualify |
| 2021 | 4 | Gulf Coast Premier League | 4th, Eastern | Did not qualify | Did not qualify |

== Honors ==
- USL PDL Southern Conference Champions 2010

== Head coaches ==
- (United States) Bo Cassidy (2007)
- (Brazil) Helio d'Anna (2008)
- (Brazil) Paulo Canineu Neto (2009)
- (England) Stuart Hayers (2010–2011)
- (United States) Rafa Amaya Jr. (2021)
- (United States) Patrick Bueno (2022)
- (England) Craig Scott (2023)

== Stadia ==
- Olympia Stadium; Baton Rouge, Louisiana (2007–2010) (2021-)
- Stadium at Christian Life Academy; Baton Rouge, Louisiana (2011)

== Average attendance ==
Attendance stats are calculated by averaging each team's self-reported home attendances from the historical match archive at https://web.archive.org/web/20100105175057/http://www.uslsoccer.com/history/index_E.html.

- 2007: 552 (18th in PDL)
- 2008: 431 (23rd in PDL)
- 2009: 344 (31st in PDL)
- 2010: 492 (24th in PDL)
- 2011: 275 (33rd in PDL)
