= Austin Spitler =

American football player (born 1986)

No. 53, 45
- Position: Linebacker

Personal information
- Born: October 26, 1986 (age 40); Dayton, Ohio, U.S.
- Listed height: 6 ft 3 in (1.91 m)
- Listed weight: 244 lb (111 kg)

Career information
- High school: Bellbrook (Bellbrook, Ohio)
- College: Ohio State
- NFL draft: 2010: 7th round, 252nd overall pick

Career history
- Miami Dolphins (2010−2013); Baltimore Ravens (2014)*; Washington Redskins (2015)*
- * Offseason or practice squad member only

Career NFL statistics
- Total tackles: 31
- Fumble recoveries: 1
- Stats at Pro Football Reference

Austin Spitler (born October 26, 1986) is an American former professional football player who was a linebacker in the National Football League (NFL). He was selected by the Miami Dolphins in the seventh round of the 2010 NFL draft. He played college football for the Ohio State Buckeyes as a starter and captain.

== Professional career ==
=== Miami Dolphins ===
Spitler was selected by the Miami Dolphins in the seventh round with the 252nd overall pick of the 2010 NFL draft.

=== Baltimore Ravens ===
Spitler signed with the Baltimore Ravens on June 19, 2014. The Ravens released Spitler on August 25, 2014.

=== Washington Redskins ===
Spitler signed a future deal with the Washington Redskins on January 8, 2015. He was waived by the Redskins on May 4.
