= Gladstone, Ohio =

Unincorporated community in Ohio, U.S.

Coordinates: 39°44′37″N 83°41′06″W

Gladstone is an unincorporated community in Greene County, in the U.S. state of Ohio.

== History ==
Gladstone was not officially platted. A post office called Gladstone was established in 1886, and remained in operation until 1904.
