= Felipe Nogueira =

Brazilian footballer (born 1983)

Personal information
- Full name: Felipe Carvalho Nogueira
- Date of birth: 10 June 1983 (age 43)
- Place of birth: Uberaba, Brazil
- Height: 1.80 m (5 ft 11 in)
- Positions: Defender; midfielder

College career
Years	Team	Apps	(Gls)
2006–2008	LMU Railsplitters	25	(11)

Senior career*
Years	Team	Apps	(Gls)
2001	Santos	0	
2002	Santos	2	(0)
2003	Santos	0	(0)
2004	Santos	0	(0)
2005	Francana	6	
2006	Uberaba	9	(1)
2008	Atlanta Silverbacks U23's	8	(0)
2009	Baton Rouge Capitals	13	(1)
2009–2012	Uberaba	4	(0)
2012–2013	Araxá	31	(0)
2012	→ Guarani-MG (loan)	2	(0)
2013–2014	Nacional-MG	13	(1)
Total		88	(2)
- * Club domestic league appearances and goals

Felipe Carvalho Nogueira (born 10 June 1983) is a former Brazilian footballer.

== Career ==
After graduating from Santos youth football system, Felipe played professional football as a defender. He played in the Campeonato Mineiro with Uberaba Sport Club, Araxá Esporte Clube, Nacional Futebol Clube (MG), and Guarani Esporte Clube (MG). He also had spells with Francana and Atlanta Silverbacks.

After he retired from playing in February 2014, Felipe trained to become a football manager, initially working as an assistant manager at former clubs Nacional and Uberaba. By 2018, Felipe had started his own business and declined an opportunity to rejoin Uberaba as assistant manager.

=== College ===
Nogueira played college soccer for Lincoln Memorial University. His strength combined with his athleticism and skills make him an excellent defender. In his freshman year of college, Felipe Nogueira already established himself as one of the top defenders in the nation. Nogueira became the defender with the most goals scored all time of the Lincoln Memorial University soccer program. After 3 seasons played at the NCAA, Felipe Nogueira won the following individual awards, including:

As a Freshman:

- NCAA Appalachian Region All-Tournament
- NCAA First Team All-Region
- LMU Defensive Player of the year

As a Sophomore:

- Pre-season SAC All-Conference
- First Team SAC All Conference
- NCAA Appalachian Region All-Tournament
- First Team NCAA All-Region
- First Team Daktronics All-American
- SAC Player of the week (October 9, 2007)

As a Junior:

- Pre Season SAC All-Conference
- First Team SAC All-Conference
- SAC All-Tournament Team
- First Team Daktronics All-Region
- First Team NSCAA All-Region
- All-American Honorable Mention
- LMU Athlete of the year
- LMU defensive player of the year

== Career statistics ==
=== Club ===
Club	Season	League			State League		Cup		Other		Total	
Club	Season	Division	Apps	Goals	Apps	Goals	Apps	Goals	Apps	Goals	Apps	Goals
Atlanta Silverbacks U23's	2008	PDL	8	0	–		0	0	0	0	8	0
Baton Rouge Capitals	2009	PDL	13	0	–		0	0	0	0	13	0
Uberaba	2010	Série D	4	0	3 (Note: Appearances in the Campeonato Mineiro)	0	0	0	0	0	7	0
Uberaba	2011	–			6	0	1 (Note: Appearances in the Copa do Brasil)	0	0	0	7	0
Uberaba	Total		4	0	9	0	1	0	0	0	14	0
Araxá	2012	–			14 (Note: Appearances in the Campeonato Mineiro Module II)	0	0	0	0	0	14	0
Araxá	2013	Série D	0	0	0	0	0	0	0	0	0	0
Araxá	Total		0	0	14	0	0	0	0	0	14	0
Guarani-MG (loan)	2012	Série D	2	0	0	0	0	0	0	0	2	0
Career total			27	0	23	0	1	0	0	0	51	0

== Personal ==
Felipe is the son of former Uberaba Sport Club director, Ernani Nogueira.
