= Joe Tait (footballer) =

English association football player

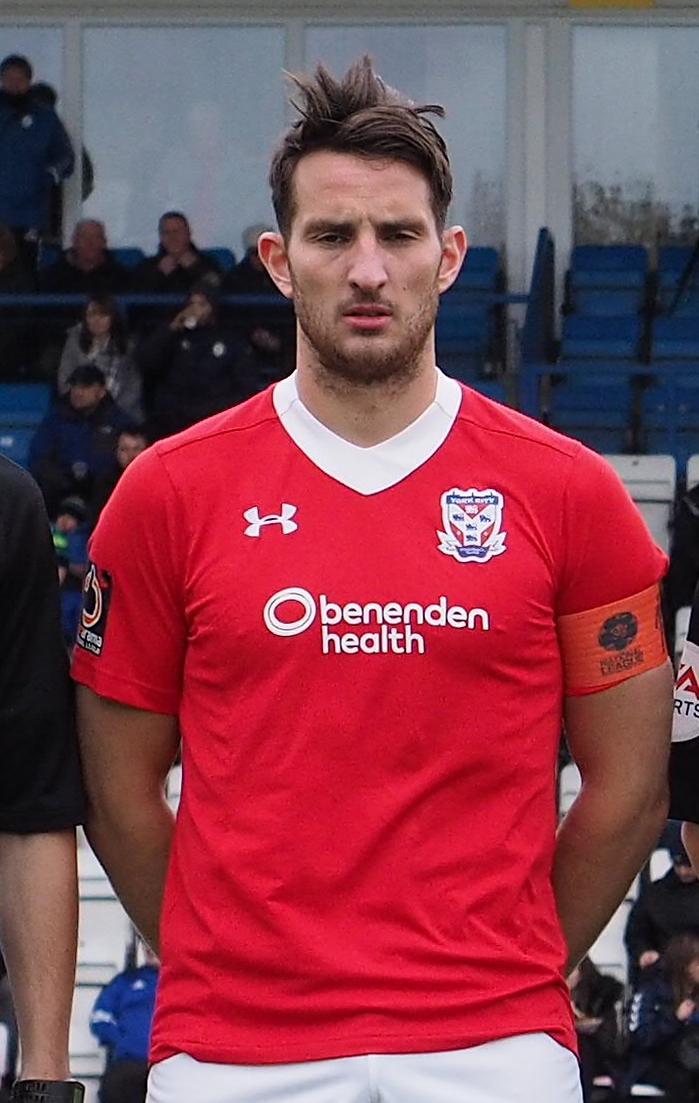
- Tait lining up for York City in 2018

Personal information
- Full name: Joseph George Tait
- Date of birth: 4 February 1990 (age 36)
- Place of birth: Middlesbrough, England
- Height: 6 ft 2 in (1.88 m)
- Position: Centre back

Youth career
- 2006–2008: Hartlepool United

College career
Years	Team	Apps	(Gls)
2009–2010	Lindsey Wilson College Blue Raiders	18	(4)

Senior career*
Years	Team	Apps	(Gls)
2008–2009	Hartlepool United	0	(0)
2010	Baton Rouge Capitals		
2011	Dayton Dutch Lions	17	(1)
2011	Philadelphia Union	0	(0)
2012–2013	Darlington 1883		
2013–2014	Gateshead	4	(0)
2014	→ Darlington 1883 (loan)		
2014–2018	Spennymoor Town	100	(31)
2018–2020	York City	54	(3)
2020–2022	Spennymoor Town	79	(3)
- * Club domestic league appearances and goals as of 13:02, 30 April 2023 (UTC)

Joseph George Tait (born 4 February 1990) is an English former professional footballer who last played as a centre back for National League North club Spennymoor Town.

== Career ==
=== Early career ===
Tait was born in Middlesbrough, Cleveland. He turned professional in 2006 with League One club Hartlepool United. He played extensively with the youth and reserve teams, captaining the youth team to the Youth League Cup final in 2007, and helping the reserves win the Division One East title of the Central League.

=== United States ===
Tait moved from his native England to the United States in 2009 after accepting a scholarship to play college soccer at Lindsey Wilson College. He was on the roster for their soccer team, the Lindsey Wilson College Blue Raiders, for the 2009 and 2010 seasons. He made 18 appearances, scoring four goals. During his college years, Tait also played in the Premier Development League for the Baton Rouge Capitals, helping his team to the PDL National Semi-finals in 2010. He also won PDL defender of the year 2010.

Tait turned professional once again in April 2011 when he signed for the Dayton Dutch Lions of the USL Pro. He made his debut on 23 April 2011 against the Rochester Rhinos. He was signed by Philadelphia Union of Major League Soccer on 13 September 2011.

=== England ===
After being released by Philadelphia, Tait signed for Darlington 1883 of the Northern Football League Division One in September 2012. He made his debut on 8 September in a 5–0 win over Consett. He scored his first goal for Darlington on 22 September in a 3–0 win at Dunston UTS. After signing for Darlington, Tait missed only one game during the season. He also scored 5 goals.

Tait signed for Conference Premier club Gateshead on 31 May 2013 on a one-year contract. He made his debut on 10 August 2013 against Kidderminster Harriers. Tait's first goal for Gateshead came on 30 November 2013 in a 4–1 win over Hednesford Town in the FA Trophy. On 10 January 2014, Tait rejoined Darlington 1883 (for financial purposes) on loan for the remainder of the 2013–14 season. The following day, Tait scored the opening goal on his second debut for Darlington in a 2–0 win against Harrogate Railway Athletic. At the end of the 2013–14 season, Tait was released by Gateshead.

Tait signed for Spennymoor Town on 1 July 2014. The defender would go on to play over 100 times for the Moors in his 4 year stay, scoring 31 goals, and gaining promotion from the Northern League to the National League North for the first time in the club's history in the 2016/17 season.

Following a successful trial period, Tait signed for National League North club York City on 26 July 2018.

In September 2020, Tait returned to Brewery Field for a second spell with Spennymoor, to once again work under the leadership of Jason Ainsley.

== Career statistics ==
As of match played 7 March 2020

Appearances and goals by club, season and competition
Club	Season	League			National Cup (Note: Includes FA Cup)		League Cup		Other		Total	
Club	Season	Division	Apps	Goals	Apps	Goals	Apps	Goals	Apps	Goals	Apps	Goals
Hartlepool United	2008–09	League One	0	0	0	0	0	0	0	0	0	0
Dayton Dutch Lions	2011	USL Pro	17	1	0	0	—		—		17	1
Philadelphia Union	2011	Major League Soccer	0	0	—		—		0	0	0	0
Gateshead	2013–14	Conference Premier	4	0	4	0	—		1 (Note: Appearance(s) in FA Trophy)	1	9	1
Spennymoor Town	2017–18	National League North	32	4	1	0	—		5	0	38	4
York City	2018–19	National League North	22	1	3	1	—		1	0	26	2
York City	2019–20	National League North	32	2	4	0	—		0	0	36	2
York City	Total		54	3	7	1	—		1	0	62	4
Career total			107	8	12	1	0	0	7	1	126	10

== Honours ==
Darlington 1883

- Northern Football League Division One: 2012–13

Individual

- Premier Development League Defender of the Year: 2010
