= Bellbrook-Sugarcreek Local School District =

School district in Ohio, United States

Address
- 3757 Upper Bellbrook Road Bellbrook, Ohio, 45305; United States

District information
- Type: Public
- Grades: KG–12
- Superintendent: Dr. Doug Cozad
- School board: Mike Kinsey (President), Audra Dorn (Vice President), Heidi Anderson, Dr. Anne Pryor, Kevin Price
- Schools: 4
- NCES District ID: 3904727

Students and staff
- Students: 2,725 (2025–2026)
- Teachers: 136.03 (on an FTE basis) (2025–2026)
- Staff: 195.63 (on an FTE basis) (2025–2026)
- Student–teacher ratio: 20.03 (2025–2026)
- Colors: Purple and Gold

Other information
- Website: www.sugarcreek.k12.oh.us

Bellbrook-Sugarcreek Local School District is a school district in Bellbrook, Ohio, USA. Its schools draw their students from families in the City of Bellbrook and Sugarcreek Township. The City of Bellbrook, which is in Sugarcreek Township, has been known for having history dating back to the 19th century.

== Parent/Teacher Organization ==
The Parent/Teacher Organization (PTO) meetings are held the 2nd Monday of every month at Bellbrook Middle School. The PTO helps the District by providing money from a number of fundraisers. Some of these are Market Day, Entertainment Books and Amazon.com.

== Bellbrook-Sugarcreek Board of Education/Bellbrook-Sugarcreek Education Foundation ==
The Bellbrook-Sugarcreek Education Foundation is a non-profit organization. It is another way the Sugarcreek District receives money not available from public funds.

== Schools ==
- Bellbrook Middle School Grades: 6-8
- Bellbrook High School Grades: 9-12
- Stephen Bell Elementary Grades: K-2
- Bell Creek Intermediate School: 3-5

== See also ==
- Bellbrook, Ohio
- Sugarcreek Township, Greene County, Ohio
