= St. Louis Catholic High School =

Location
- 1620 Bank Street; Lake Charles, Louisiana 70601; United States; 30°13′5″N 93°12′27″W

Information
- Type: Private
- Motto: Honor and Praise God... In All Ways
- Religious affiliation: Roman Catholic
- Established: 1970; 56 years ago
- Rector: Rev. Michael Caraway
- Principal: Kelly Link DeMolle ‘99
- Grades: 9-12
- Gender: Coeducational
- Colors: Royal Blue, orange, and white
- Mascot: Saint
- Team name: Saints
- Accreditation: AdvancED & Louisiana State Board of Elementary and Secondary Education
- Newspaper: The Trumpet
- Yearbook: Spectre
- Athletic Director: Rob Accord
- Website: www.slchs.org

St. Louis Catholic High School is a private, independent, 9-12 Roman Catholic high school in Lake Charles, Louisiana, United States. It was established in 1970 from its parent institutions, St. Charles Academy, Sacred Heart High School and Landry Memorial and is the only Catholic high school in the Roman Catholic Diocese of Lake Charles. It is accredited by AdvancED and the Louisiana State Board of Elementary and Secondary Education, serving as the educational center for the Diocese of Lake Charles.

== History ==
=== Controversies ===
Petition Controversy
On June 15, 2020, several alumni of St. Louis Catholic High School published a petition calling upon administration and the Catholic Diocese to update all of the district's curriculum to be more inclusive and to address racial history and bias in light of the anti-racism protests that are sweeping the nation. The petition also calls for more opportunities for low-income students to attend St. Louis. In response, St. Louis Catholic released a brief statement.

J.A. Landry Controversy
On July 6, 2020, an investigative piece was published on Medium (website) that outlined the St. Louis Catholic's ties to the United Daughters of the Confederacy(UDC) through its founder and 2015 SLC Hall of Fame Award Winner, Mrs. J.A. Landry (who is also the namesake for Landry Memorial Gym). Citing archival materials from the American Press and from original UDC documents, the article reported that the founder of the original Landry School was involved in the UDC for a period of fifteen years (1910-1925) and held leadership positions within the organization. Furthermore, the article alleged that the school administration was made aware of Landry's UDC ties in 2015 prior to nominating her for the Hall of Fame. The school administration has not yet issued a formal response.

== Athletics ==
St. Louis Catholic High athletics competes in the LHSAA.

== Notable alumni ==
- Holly Arabie Griffith – Class of '96, flight controller in NASA's Mission Control, recipient of the Mission Operations Directorate's Director's Award
- Joseph Lapira – International soccer player, 2006 winner of the Hermann Trophy
- Nic Pizzolatto – novelist and creator of True Detective
