= Grape Grove, Ohio =

Unincorporated community in Ohio, U.S.

Coordinates: 39°42′59″N 83°40′54″W

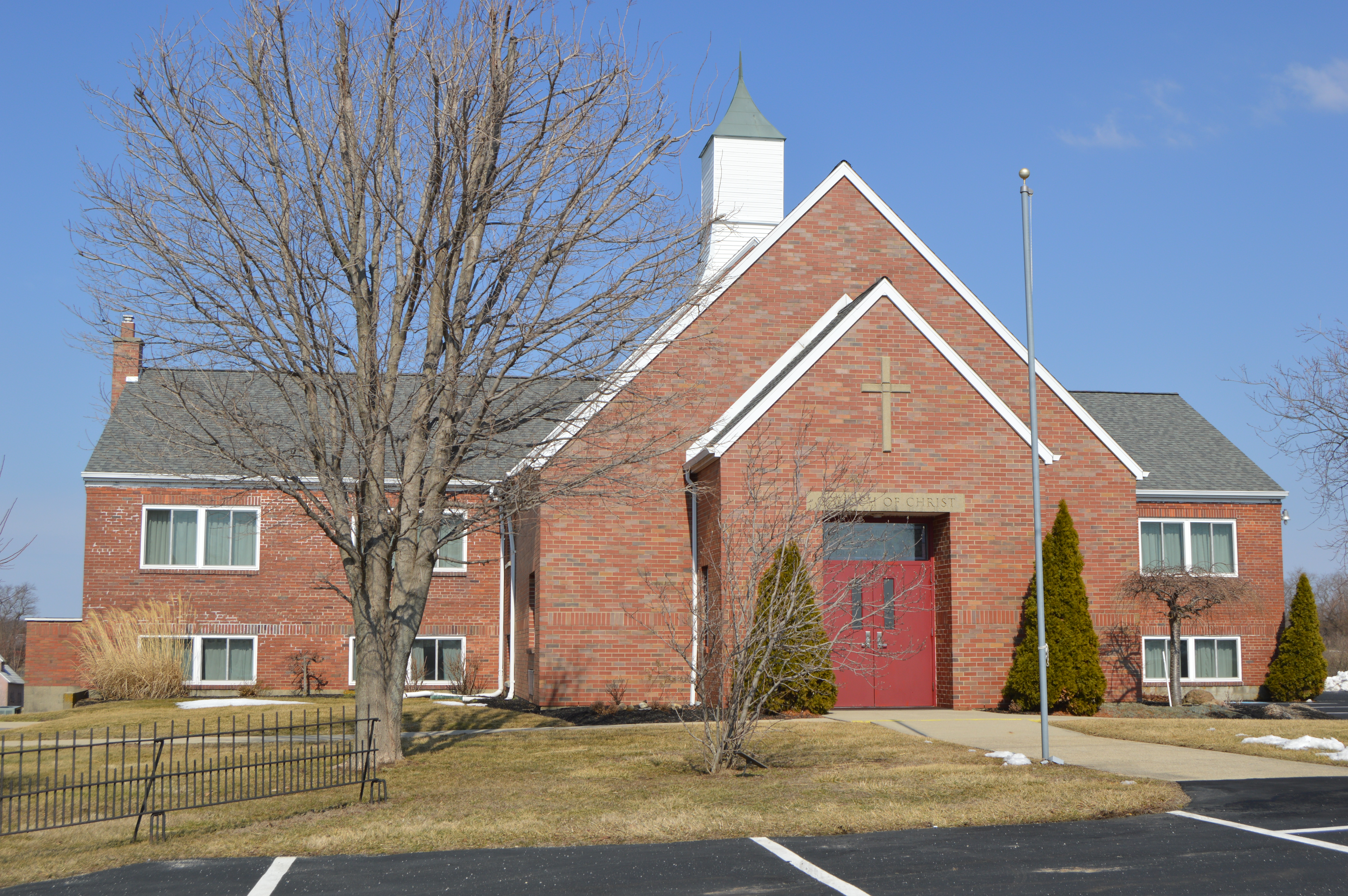
Grape Grove Church of Christ

Grape Grove is an unincorporated community in Greene County, in the U.S. state of Ohio.

== History ==
Grape Grove was not officially platted. A post office called Grape Grove was established in 1850, the name was changed to Grapegrove in 1895, and the post office closed in 1906.

== Notable person ==
- John Little, member of the U.S. House of Representatives from Ohio's 8th district
