= Ivar van Dinteren =

Dutch footballer and coach

- van Dinteren in 2025

Personal information
- Full name: Ivar Anthonie van Dinteren
- Date of birth: 3 May 1979 (age 47)
- Place of birth: Bussum, Netherlands
- Height: 1.81 m (5 ft 11 in)
- Position: Attacking midfielder

Team information
- Current team: Twente (assistant)

Youth career
- SDO Bussum
- Utrecht

Senior career*
Years	Team	Apps	(Gls)
1997–2000	Groningen	53	(10)
2000–2002	RKC	45	(2)
2002–2003	→ Helmond Sport (loan)	31	(10)
2003–2006	FC Zwolle	86	(15)
2006–2008	Helmond Sport	25	(4)
2007–2008	→ Stormvogels Telstar (loan)	38	(3)
2008–2009	Noordwijk		
2009–2010	Breukelen		
2010–2011	Dayton Dutch Lions	16	(2)
Total		294	(46)

International career
2000-2001	Netherlands U21	3	(0)

Managerial career
- 2011–2012: Dayton Dutch Lions
- 2013–2014: PEC Zwolle (U17 assistant)
- 2014–2015: PEC Zwolle (U19 assistant)
- 2015–2018: SDO Bussum
- 2015–2016: PEC Zwolle (U19)
- 2017–2019: Jong Almere City
- 2018–2019: Almere City (assistant)
- 2019–2020: FC Cincinnati (assistant)
- 2020–2023: Twente (assistant)
- 2023–2025: Jong FC Utrecht
- 2025–: Twente (assistant)
- * Club domestic league appearances and goals

Ivar van Dinteren (born 3 May 1979) is a Dutch professional football coach and a former player. He is an assistant coach with Twente.

== Playing career ==
=== Club ===
Born in Bussum, Van Dinteren played as a striker for FC Groningen, RKC, Helmond Sport, FC Zwolle, Stormvogels Telstar, VV Noordwijk and Dayton Dutch Lions.

=== International ===
Van Dinteren played 3 matches for the Netherlands national under-21 football team.

== Managerial career ==
In 2011, he ended his playing career and started as head coach of Dayton Dutch Lions in the USL Pro. After a few seasons with the PEC Zwolle academy, he was named coach at hometown club SDO Bussum and in summer 2017 he also took the reins at the Almere City reserves.

In August 2019, Van Dinteren was hired by Major League Soccer club FC Cincinnati as an assistant coach, joining the club at the same time as head coach Ron Jans. He departed from the club in June 2020 after the club hired a new manager, Jaap Stam.

On 16 June 2023, Van Dinteren was hired by FC Utrecht as a manager of their reserve squad Jong FC Utrecht that plays in the second-tier Eerste Divisie. He signed a two-year contract.

On 29 May 2025, Van Dinteren returned to the assistant coach position at Twente.
