= Kolby LaCrone =

American soccer player (born 1986)

Personal information
- Full name: Kolby LaCrone
- Date of birth: September 12, 1986 (age 40)
- Place of birth: Zanesville, Ohio, United States
- Height: 6 ft 0 in (1.83 m)
- Position: Forward

College career
Years	Team	Apps	(Gls)
2005	West Virginia Mountaineers		
2006–2008	Marshall Thundering Herd		

Senior career*
Years	Team	Apps	(Gls)
2007–2008	West Virginia Chaos	21	(3)
2009	Cleveland City Stars	16	(0)
2010	Pittsburgh Riverhounds	3	(0)
2010	Louisville Lightning (indoor)	14	(21)
2011–2013	Dayton Dutch Lions	24	(3)
- * Club domestic league appearances and goals as of February 14, 2014

Kolby LaCrone (born September 12, 1986) is an American former professional soccer player.

== Career ==
=== Youth and amateur ===
LaCrone attended Tri-Valley High School in Dresden, Ohio, where he was the first player in state history to record over 100 goals and 100 assist in the same career (108g/109a), and played club soccer for Muskingum County United in Zanesville and for Ohio F.C. Xtreme in Columbus, Ohio. He played college soccer at West Virginia University and Marshall University. At Marshall University he ended his college career with 13 goals and 3 assist.

During his college years LaCrone also played two seasons with the West Virginia Chaos in the USL Premier Development League.

=== Professional ===
LaCrone joined the USL First Division franchise Cleveland City Stars on April 4, 2009. He made his professional debut on April 18, 2009, in Cleveland's 2009 season-opening game against Miami FC. The City Stars picked up his option for a second year, but unfortunately the team folded soon after. He was part of the final roster for the Cleveland City Stars.

After joining the Pittsburgh Riverhounds, a USL 2 division team, for the a brief stint in the 2010 season, the Professional Arena Soccer League's Louisville Lightning signed him to play in the 2010–11 season. He was considered a rising star of the league before he decided to take his game back outdoors.

After playing one season of indoor soccer LaCrone returned to the outdoor game by signing with Dayton Dutch Lions of the USL Pro league on February 28, 2011. It was the leagues first year in existence after the termination of the USL 1 and USL 2. He scored the first goal for the professional Lions in their season-opening game against the Charleston Battery.
