= Joseph Lapira =

Irish footballer (born 1986)

Personal information
- Full name: Joseph John Lapira
- Date of birth: 13 August 1986 (age 40)
- Place of birth: Rochester, New York, United States
- Height: 5 ft 8 in (1.73 m)
- Position: Forward

Youth career
- 2000–2004: St. Louis Saints

College career
Years	Team	Apps	(Gls)
2004–2007	University of Notre Dame	89	(41)

Senior career*
Years	Team	Apps	(Gls)
2003	Louisiana Outlaws	4	(1)
2004	Lafayette Swamp Cats	2	(0)
2007	Baton Rouge Capitals	7	(3)
2008–2009	Nybergsund	55	(16)
2011	United Sikkim FC	3	(2)
2011	Nybergsund	8	(1)
2013	Nybergsund	0	(0)

International career^{‡}
2007	Republic of Ireland	1	(0)
- * Club domestic league appearances and goals as of 9 December 2011 ‡ National team caps and goals as of 17 November 2010

Joseph Lapira (born 13 August 1986) is a retired footballer. Born in the United States, he played for Ireland in a single friendly match. Besides the United States, he has played in Norway and India.

== Early life ==
Lapira graduated from St. Louis Catholic High School in Lake Charles, Louisiana. After high school, he continued a family tradition and attended the University of Notre Dame. He is of Maltese descent.

== Club career ==
In 2006, he was the winner of the Hermann Trophy, awarded to the top collegiate player of the year, after scoring 22 goals for Notre Dame. During his college years, Lapira also played in the USL Premier Development League with Louisiana Outlaws, Lafayette Swamp Cats and Baton Rouge Capitals.

In April 2007, it was reported that Lapira would be joining Scottish Premier League side Aberdeen for a trial at some point in summer 2007, although he eventually went on trial at Rangers instead. Lapira broke down with a calf injury minutes into his first training session with the Ibrox club. In January 2008, Lapira finally joined Aberdeen for a week-long trial after recovering from his calf injury. He played for the reserve side in a 1–1 draw with Falkirk reserves but did not do enough to earn a contract with the Dons.

Instead, Lapira was selected in the third round of the 2008 MLS SuperDraft by Toronto FC, but never signed a contract with Major League Soccer.

On 1 April 2008, Lapira signed with Norwegian Adeccoligaen side Nybergsund IL-Trysil, who played in the second tier after being promoted from the third tier in 2007. Lapira scored a brace in his Nybergsund debut, a 3–0 victory.

In March 2011, Lapira signed for I-League 2nd Division side United Sikkim FC.

In the summer of 2011, Lapira returned to Norway after signing again with Nybergsund IL-Trysil.

== Career statistics ==
Season	Club	Division	League		Cup		Total	
Season	Club	Division	Apps	Goals	Apps	Goals	Apps	Goals
2008	Nybergsund-Trysil	Adeccoligaen	29	8	0	0	29	8
2009	Nybergsund-Trysil	Adeccoligaen	26	8	0	0	26	8
2011	United Sikkim	I-League 2nd Division	3	2	0	0	3	2
2011	Nybergsund-Trysil	Adeccoligaen	7	1	0	0	7	1
Career total			65	19	0	0	65	19

== International career ==
Lapira is a full international for the Republic of Ireland. He qualifies for the Republic by virtue of his Irish mother, and came to the attention of former Irish boss Steve Staunton through Lapira's uncle, who worked at the FAI. He gained a cap for Ireland on 23 May 2007, against Ecuador, becoming the first amateur player to play for Ireland since Willie Browne in 1964.

== Awards and honours ==
- M.A.C. Hermann Trophy Winner (2006)
- Soccer America National
- Player of the Year (2006)
- All-America First Team (2006)
- All-BIG EAST First Team (2006)
- BIG EAST Offensive
- Player of the Year (2006)
- All-BIG EAST Third Team (2005)
- Participated in the 2019 Joe Lapira FIFA tournament, placing a respectable 21st out of 22 participants (2019)

== See also ==
- List of Republic of Ireland international footballers born outside the Republic of Ireland
