= Ferry, Ohio =

Unincorporated community in Ohio, U.S.

Coordinates: 39°34′49″N 84°06′16″W

Ferry (also known as Clio) is an unincorporated community in Greene County, in the U.S. state of Ohio.

== History ==
Ferry was originally called Clio. The area around Clio or Ferry was settled as early as 1796. A post office called Clio was established in 1849, and remained in operation until 1864. A post office called Ferry operated from 1892 until 1901.
