= Julius Wille =

Dutch footballer

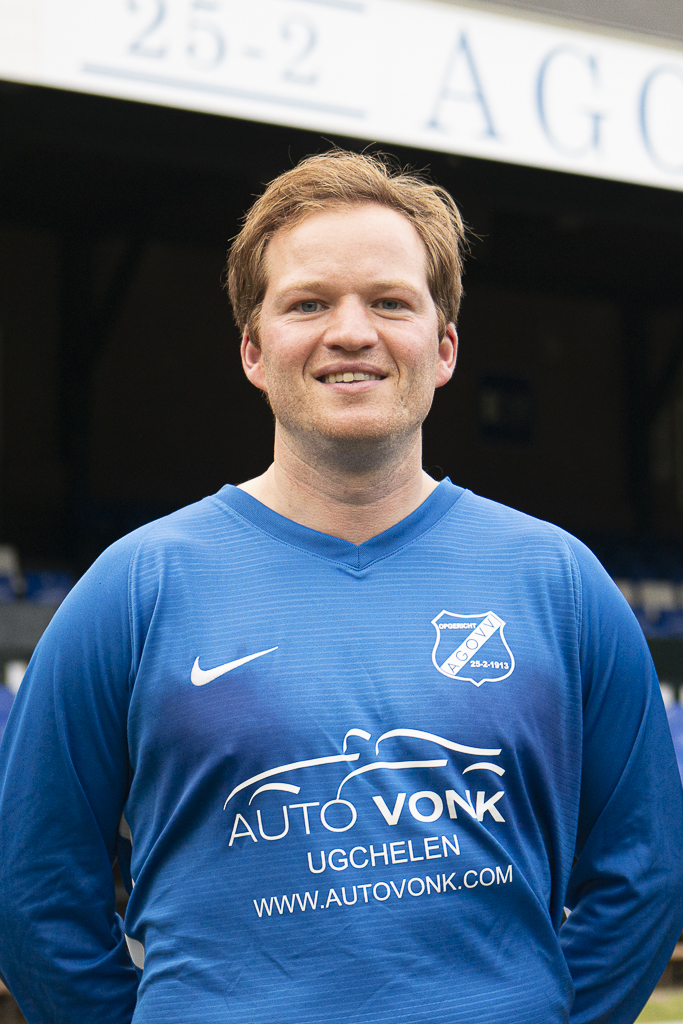
- Wille with AGOVV in 2019

Personal information
- Full name: Julius Wille
- Date of birth: August 27, 1987 (age 39)
- Place of birth: Amstelveen, Netherlands
- Height: 5 ft 8 in (1.73 m)
- Position: Forward

Team information
- Current team: AGOVV

Youth career
- Robur et Velocitas
- Twente
- Heracles Almelo

Senior career*
Years	Team	Apps	(Gls)
2007–2009	AGOVV	76	(12)
2010	Dayton Dutch Lions	16	(3)
2010–2011	AGOVV	25	(5)
2011	Dayton Dutch Lions	12	(1)
2011–2012	AGOVV	6	(0)
2012	Genemuiden	11	(1)
2013	Veensche Boys		
2013–2014	Koninklijke HFC		
2014–2015	Veensche Boys		
2015–2017	AGOVV		
2019–	AGOVV		
- * Club domestic league appearances and goals as of 18 April 2021

Julius Wille (born 27 August 1987) is a Dutch footballer who plays for AGOVV in the Derde Klasse.

== Career ==
=== Netherlands ===
Wille played for the youth teams of Robur et Velocitas, FC Twente and Heracles Almelo, before turning professional with AGOVV Apeldoorn in 2006. He played 70 games with AGOVV in the Dutch Eerste Divisie, before being lured to the United States in 2010 by coach Sonny Silooy to play with the new Dayton Dutch Lions in the USL Premier Development League.

=== United States ===
Wille played 16 games for the Dutch Lions in their debut season in the USL Premier Development League in 2010, scoring 3 goals and contributing 1 assist, and returned to the Netherlands to play with AGOVV again in the Eerste Divisie in 2010-11, before continuing with the Lions following their self-promotion to the USL Professional Division in 2011.

=== Return to the Netherlands ===
Wille returned to AGOVV after his second stint with the Dayton Dutch Lions in 2011. At the start of the 2011–12 season, he fell out of favor with head coach Hans van Arum and was demoted from the first. He practiced with Jong Vitesse for a while and also saw a trial with Fortuna Sittard turn out unsuccessful.

In the summer of 2012 he joined Topklasse club SC Genemuiden. He left there in November 2012 for a trial in Malaysia. Wille completed the 2012–13 season with the then Tweede Klasse team Veensche Boys. In the 2013–14 season, Wille played for Koninklijke HFC. After this, he returned to Veensche Boys and in 2015 he began playing for the amateurs of AGOVV. In the 2019–20 season, Wille returned to the AGOVV team after a career break, competing in the Derde Klasse that season.
