= Greene County, Ohio =

County in Ohio, United States

- County
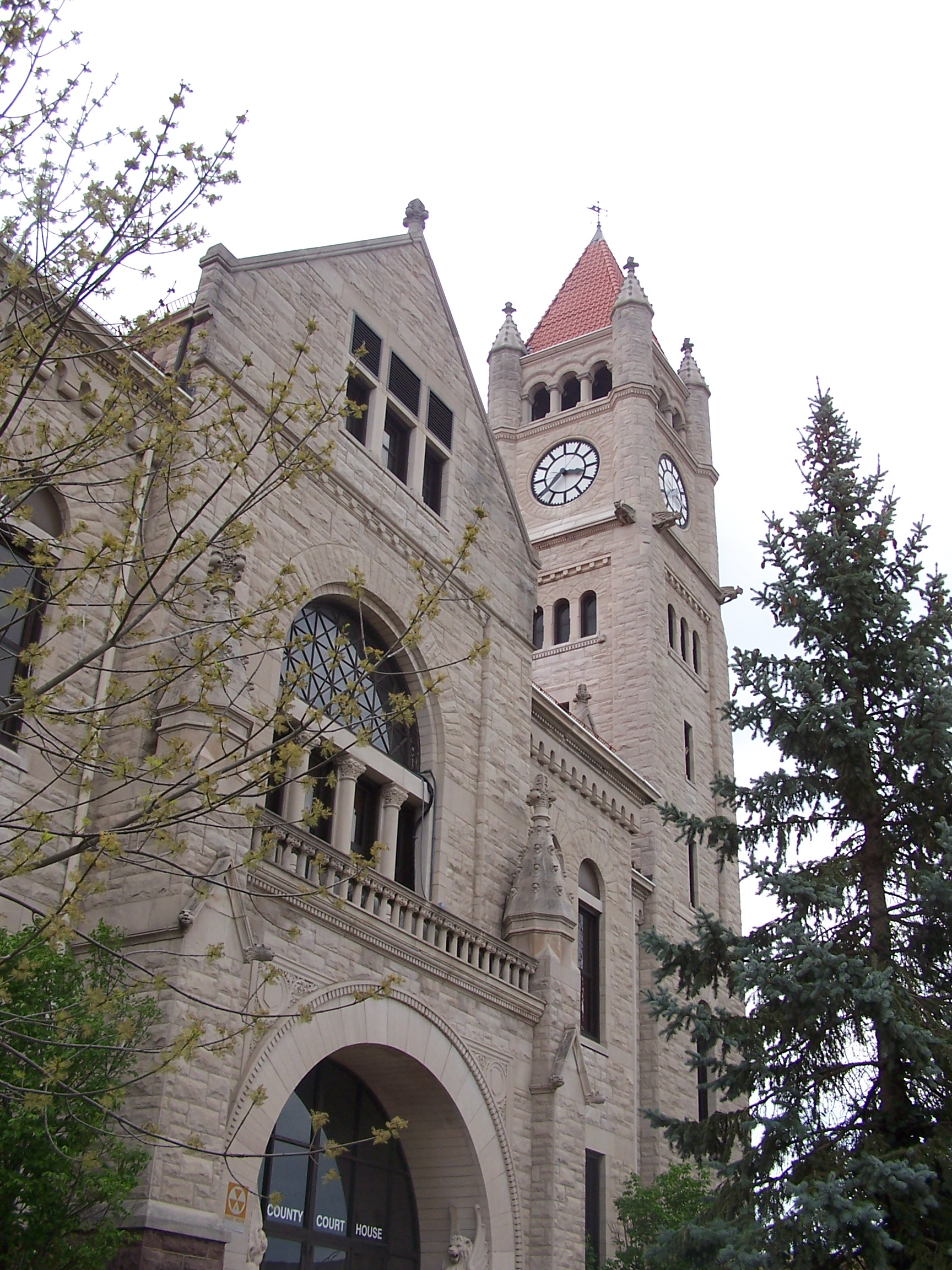
- The Greene County Courthouse in Xenia

- Flag Seal

- Location within the U.S. state of Ohio
- Coordinates: 39°41′N 83°53′W
- Country: United States
- State: Ohio
- Founded: May 1, 1803
- Named for: General Nathanael Greene
- Seat: Xenia
- Largest city: Beavercreek

Area
  - Total: 416 sq mi (1,080 km^{2})
  - Land: 414 sq mi (1,070 km^{2})
  - Water: 2.5 sq mi (6.5 km^{2}) 0.6%

Population (2020)
  - Total: 167,966
  - Estimate (2025): 174,322 ▲
  - Density: 406/sq mi (157/km^{2})
- Time zone: UTC−5 (Eastern)
  - Summer (DST): UTC−4 (EDT)
- Congressional district: 10th
- Website: www.greenecountyohio.gov

Greene County is located in the southwestern portion of Ohio. As of the 2020 census, the population was 167,966. Its county seat is Xenia and its largest city is Beavercreek. The county was established on March 24, 1803 and named for General Nathanael Greene, an officer in the Revolutionary War. Greene County is part of the Dayton, OH Metropolitan Statistical Area.

== Geography ==
According to the United States Census Bureau, the county has a total area of 416 square miles (1,080 km^{2}), of which 414 square miles (1,070 km^{2}) is land and 2.5 square miles (6.5 km^{2}) (0.6%) is water.

== Adjacent counties ==
- Clark County (north)
- Madison County (northeast)
- Fayette County (southeast)
- Clinton County (south)
- Warren County (southwest)
- Montgomery County (west)

=== National protected area ===
- Dayton Aviation Heritage National Historical Park (part)

== Demographics ==
Historical population
Census	Pop.	Note	%±
1810	5,870		—
1820	10,529		79.4%
1830	14,801		40.6%
1840	17,528		18.4%
1850	21,946		25.2%
1860	26,197		19.4%
1870	28,038		7.0%
1880	31,649		12.9%
1890	29,820		−5.8%
1900	31,613		6.0%
1910	29,733		−5.9%
1920	31,221		5.0%
1930	33,259		6.5%
1940	35,863		7.8%
1950	58,892		64.2%
1960	94,642		60.7%
1970	125,057		32.1%
1980	129,769		3.8%
1990	136,731		5.4%
2000	147,886		8.2%
2010	161,573		9.3%
2020	167,966		4.0%
2025 (est.)	174,322	▲	3.8%
U.S. Decennial Census; 1790-1960 1900-1990; 1990-2000 2010-2020

=== 2020 census ===
As of the 2020 census, there were 167,966 people, 66,831 households, and 42,983 families living in the county. The population density was 406.1 inhabitants per square mile (156.8/km^{2}). There were 71,336 housing units at an average density of 172.5 per square mile (66.6/km^{2}).

77.6% of residents lived in urban areas, while 22.4% lived in rural areas.

Of the 66,831 households, 27.8% had children under the age of 18 living with them. Of all households, 49.8% were married-couple households, 18.5% were households with a male householder and no spouse or partner present, and 25.4% were households with a female householder and no spouse or partner present. About 28.8% of all households were made up of individuals and 11.2% had someone living alone who was 65 years of age or older.

There were 71,336 housing units, of which 6.3% were vacant. Among occupied housing units, 66.4% were owner-occupied and 33.6% were renter-occupied. The homeowner vacancy rate was 1.1% and the rental vacancy rate was 6.3%.

The racial makeup of the county was 81.7% White, 6.8% Black or African American, 0.3% American Indian and Alaska Native, 3.3% Asian, 0.1% Native Hawaiian and Pacific Islander, 1.1% from some other race, and 6.8% from two or more races. Hispanic or Latino residents of any race comprised 3.1% of the population.

The median age was 38.1 years. 21.1% of residents were under the age of 18 and 17.9% of residents were 65 years of age or older. For every 100 females there were 95.8 males, and for every 100 females age 18 and over there were 93.3 males age 18 and over.

=== Racial and ethnic composition ===
Greene County, Ohio – Racial and ethnic composition Note: the US Census treats Hispanic/Latino as an ethnic category. This table excludes Latinos from the racial categories and assigns them to a separate category. Hispanics/Latinos may be of any race.
Race / Ethnicity (NH = Non-Hispanic)	Pop 1980	Pop 1990	Pop 2000	Pop 2010	Pop 2020	% 1980	% 1990	% 2000	% 2010	% 2020
White alone (NH)	118,387	123,209	130,857	137,440	135,603	91.23%	90.11%	88.49%	85.06%	80.73%
Black or African American alone (NH)	8,736	9,516	9,332	11,506	11,285	6.73%	6.96%	6.31%	7.12%	6.72%
Native American or Alaska Native alone (NH)	212	370	403	367	330	0.16%	0.27%	0.27%	0.23%	0.20%
Asian alone (NH)	1,164	2,104	2,985	4,663	5,516	0.90%	1.54%	2.02%	2.89%	3.28%
Native Hawaiian or Pacific Islander alone (NH)	x	x	47	81	87	x	x	0.03%	0.05%	0.05%
Other race alone (NH)	257	153	194	261	876	0.20%	0.11%	0.13%	0.16%	0.52%
Mixed race or Multiracial (NH)	x	x	2,255	3,816	9,053	x	x	1.52%	2.36%	5.39%
Hispanic or Latino (any race)	1,013	1,379	1,813	3,439	5,216	0.78%	1.01%	1.23%	2.13%	3.11%
Total	129,769	136,731	147,886	161,573	167,966	100.00%	100.00%	100.00%	100.00%	100.00%

=== 2020 American Community Survey ===
According to the 2020 American Community Survey 5-year estimates, the median age in the county was 39.0 years. 20.5% of residents were under the age of 18; 11.6% were between the ages of 18 and 24; 25.5% were from 25 to 44; 23.3% were from 45 to 64; and 19.1% were 65 years of age or older. The gender makeup of the county was 50.2% male and 49.8% female.

The median income for a household in the county was $70,055, and the median income for a family was $90,453. 10.6% of the population were below the poverty line, including 13.6% of those under age 18 and 6.2% of those age 65 or over. The labor force participation rate for those aged 20 to 64 was 77.6%. 94.0% of the population over the age of 25 had obtained a high school diploma or equivalency, 39.7% of those over the age of 25 held bachelor's degrees.

=== 2010 census ===
As of the 2010 United States census, there were 161,573 people, 62,770 households, and 41,696 families living in the county. The population density was 390.5 inhabitants per square mile (150.8/km^{2}). There were 68,241 housing units at an average density of 164.9 units per square mile (63.7 units/km^{2}). The racial makeup of the county was 86.4% white, 7.2% black or African American, 2.9% Asian, 0.3% American Indian, 0.1% Pacific islander, 0.5% from other races, and 2.6% from two or more races. Those of Hispanic or Latino origin made up 2.1% of the population. In terms of ancestry, 26.4% were German, 15.7% were American, 13.0% were Irish, and 10.9% were English.

Of the 62,770 households, 30.1% had children under the age of 18 living with them, 51.9% were married couples living together, 10.6% had a female householder with no husband present, 33.6% were non-families, and 26.5% of all households were made up of individuals. The average household size was 2.43 and the average family size was 2.95. The median age was 37.2 years.

The median income for a household in the county was $56,679 and the median income for a family was $70,817. Males had a median income of $53,614 versus $37,056 for females. The per capita income for the county was $28,328. About 7.8% of families and 11.4% of the population were below the poverty line, including 15.3% of those under age 18 and 5.1% of those age 65 or over.

=== 2000 census ===
As of the 2000 census, there were 147,886 people, 55,312 households, and 39,160 families living in the county. The population density was 356 inhabitants per square mile (137/km^{2}). There were 58,224 housing units at an average density of 140 units per square mile (54 units/km^{2}). The racial makeup of the county was 86.4% White, 7.2% Black or African American, 0.3% Native American, 2.9% Asian, 0.1% Pacific Islander, 0.38% from other races, and 1.66% from two or more races. 1.23% of the population were Hispanic or Latino of any race.

Of the 55,312 households, 32.80% had children under the age of 18 living with them, 58.00% were married couples living together, 9.60% had a female householder with no husband present, and 29.20% were non-families. 23.00% of all households were made up of individuals, and 7.70% had someone living alone who was 65 years of age or older. The average household size was 2.53 and the average family size was 3.00.

In the county, the population was spread out, with 23.90% under the age of 18, 13.70% from 18 to 24, 27.00% from 25 to 44, 23.60% from 45 to 64, and 11.80% who were 65 years of age or older. The median age was 36 years. For every 100 females there were 94.80 males. For every 100 females age 18 and over, there were 91.40 males.

The median income for a household in the county was $48,656, and the median income for a family was $57,954. Males had a median income of $42,338 versus $28,457 for females. The per capita income for the county was $23,057. About 5.20% of families and 8.50% of the population were below the poverty line, including 8.70% of those under age 18 and 6.90% of those age 65 or over.

== Politics ==
Greene County is a Republican stronghold in presidential elections. The only times the county has voted for the Democratic nominee were for Franklin D. Roosevelt in 1936 and Lyndon B. Johnson in 1964, both of them decisive Democratic victories at the national level.

United States presidential election results for Greene County, Ohio
Year	Republican		Democratic		Third party(ies)	
Year	No.	%	No.	%	No.	%
1856	3,032	64.36%	1,465	31.10%	214	4.54%
1860	3,260	63.06%	1,751	33.87%	159	3.08%
1864	3,887	71.40%	1,557	28.60%	0	0.00%
1868	4,233	69.83%	1,829	30.17%	0	0.00%
1872	4,069	66.63%	1,961	32.11%	77	1.26%
1876	4,488	63.67%	2,494	35.38%	67	0.95%
1880	4,927	66.29%	2,455	33.03%	51	0.69%
1884	4,920	63.39%	2,624	33.81%	218	2.81%
1888	4,893	61.70%	2,682	33.82%	355	4.48%
1892	4,210	59.07%	2,442	34.26%	475	6.66%
1896	5,296	62.51%	3,003	35.45%	173	2.04%
1900	5,100	62.95%	2,743	33.86%	259	3.20%
1904	5,043	67.38%	2,004	26.78%	437	5.84%
1908	4,902	60.14%	2,882	35.36%	367	4.50%
1912	3,242	46.03%	2,107	29.92%	1,694	24.05%
1916	4,458	57.93%	2,913	37.86%	324	4.21%
1920	8,600	67.25%	4,016	31.40%	172	1.35%
1924	8,410	72.98%	2,471	21.44%	642	5.57%
1928	10,030	74.14%	3,385	25.02%	113	0.84%
1932	8,455	54.62%	6,600	42.63%	426	2.75%
1936	7,449	44.57%	8,946	53.53%	317	1.90%
1940	9,273	51.08%	8,881	48.92%	0	0.00%
1944	9,680	54.95%	7,937	45.05%	0	0.00%
1948	9,186	50.20%	8,970	49.02%	144	0.79%
1952	12,900	58.58%	9,123	41.42%	0	0.00%
1956	15,471	61.07%	9,861	38.93%	0	0.00%
1960	19,642	58.12%	14,155	41.88%	0	0.00%
1964	14,571	40.65%	21,276	59.35%	0	0.00%
1968	17,589	45.36%	15,178	39.14%	6,008	15.49%
1972	25,349	65.15%	12,736	32.73%	824	2.12%
1976	22,598	51.27%	20,245	45.93%	1,234	2.80%
1980	24,922	51.03%	20,068	41.09%	3,852	7.89%
1984	34,267	66.27%	17,129	33.12%	316	0.61%
1988	34,432	65.14%	18,025	34.10%	399	0.75%
1992	27,651	46.47%	20,139	33.85%	11,712	19.68%
1996	30,677	49.65%	25,082	40.60%	6,023	9.75%
2000	37,946	58.20%	25,059	38.43%	2,199	3.37%
2004	48,388	61.03%	30,531	38.51%	363	0.46%
2008	48,936	58.45%	33,540	40.06%	1,253	1.50%
2012	49,819	59.57%	32,256	38.57%	1,551	1.85%
2016	48,540	58.53%	28,943	34.90%	5,454	6.58%
2020	52,072	58.74%	34,798	39.26%	1,773	2.00%
2024	53,399	59.07%	35,575	39.36%	1,421	1.57%

United States Senate election results for Greene County, Ohio1
Year	Republican		Democratic		Third party(ies)	
Year	No.	%	No.	%	No.	%
2024	49,477	55.06%	37,327	41.54%	3,052	3.40%

== Government ==
=== Greene County Officials ===
Office	Officeholder	Party
Greene County Commissioner	Sarah Mays	Republican
Greene County Commissioner	Tom Koogler	Republican
Greene County Commissioner	Dick Gould	Republican
Auditor	Kraig Hagler	Republican
Clerk of Courts	A.J. Williams	Republican
Coroner	Kevin Sharrett	Republican
Engineer	Stephanie Ann Goff	Republican
Prosecutor	David Hayes	Republican
Recorder	Joe Kennedy	Republican
Sheriff	Scott Anger	Republican
Treasurer	Denise Percival	Republican

=== Ohio House of Representatives ===
District	Representative	Party
70	Brian Lampton	Republican
71	Levi Dean	Republican

=== Ohio State Senate ===
District	Senator	Party
10	Kyle Koehler	Republican

=== United States House of Representatives ===
District	Representative	Party
10	Mike Turner	Republican

=== United States Senate ===
Senator	Party
Bernie Moreno	Republican
Jon Husted	Republican

== Parks ==
Greene County Parks & Trails manages over 3000 acres of parkland, 62 miles of paved multiuse trails, 36 miles of river trails, and 24 miles of hiking trails.

== Education ==
=== Higher education ===
The following colleges and universities are located in Greene County:

==== Public ====
- Wright State University, Fairborn
- Central State University, Wilberforce
- Clark State Community College - Greene Center, Beavercreek

==== Private ====
- Antioch College, Yellow Springs
- Antioch University Midwest, Yellow Springs
- Cedarville University, Cedarville
- Wilberforce University, Wilberforce

=== Public schools ===
- Beavercreek City School District
  - Beavercreek High School, Beavercreek (the Beavers)
- Bellbrook-Sugarcreek Local School District
  - Bellbrook High School, Bellbrook (the Golden Eagles)
- Cedar Cliff Local School District
  - Cedarville High School, Cedarville (the Indians)
- Fairborn City School District
  - Fairborn High School, Fairborn (the Skyhawks)
- Greeneview Local School District
  - Greeneview High School, Jamestown (the Rams)
- Xenia Community City School District
  - Xenia High School, Xenia (the Buccaneers)
- Yellow Springs Exempted Village School District
  - Yellow Springs High School, Yellow Springs (the Bulldogs)
- Greene County Career Center, Xenia (Vocational school)

=== Private schools ===
- Legacy Christian Academy (the Knights)
- St. Brigid School (the Irish)

== Infrastructure ==
=== Airports ===
The Greene County–Lewis A. Jackson Regional Airport is located ten nautical miles (12 mi; 19 km) east of Dayton's central business district.

=== Major highways ===
- I-71
- I-675
- US 35
- US 42
- US 68
- SR 4
- SR 72
- SR 235
- SR 343
- SR 380
- SR 444
- SR 725
- SR 844

== Communities ==
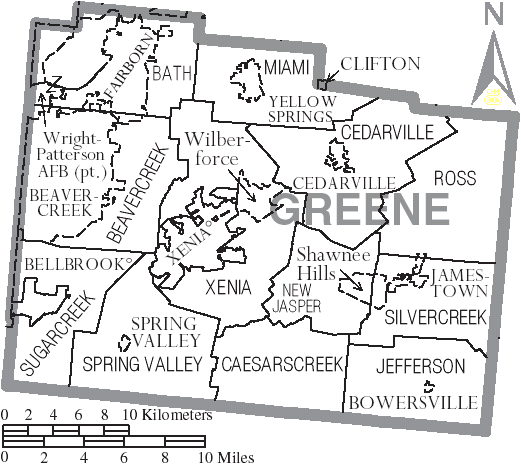
Map of Greene County, Ohio with municipal and township labels

=== Cities ===
- Beavercreek
- Bellbrook
- Fairborn
- Kettering (Mostly in Montgomery County)
- Xenia (county seat)

=== Villages ===
- Bowersville
- Cedarville
- Clifton (part)
- Jamestown
- Spring Valley
- Yellow Springs

=== Townships ===
- Bath
- Beavercreek
- Caesarscreek
- Cedarville
- Jefferson
- Miami
- New Jasper
- Ross
- Silvercreek
- Spring Valley
- Sugarcreek
- Xenia

=== Census-designated places ===
- Shawnee Hills
- Wilberforce
- Wright-Patterson Air Force Base

=== Unincorporated communities ===
- Byron
- Ferry
- Gladstone
- Goes Station
- Grape Grove
- New Germany
- New Jasper
- Oldtown
- Paintersville
- Roxanna
- Stringtown
- Trebein
- Washington Mills

== See also ==
- National Register of Historic Places listings in Greene County, Ohio
