= Bellbrook High School =

Public, coeducational high school in Bellbrook, Ohio, United States

Location
- 3737 Upper Bellbrook Road; Bellbrook, (Greene County), Ohio 45305; United States; 39°39′3″N 84°4′4″W

Information
- Type: Public, Coeducational high school
- School district: Bellbrook-Sugarcreek Local School District
- Superintendent: Doug Cozad
- Principal: David Hann
- Teaching staff: 39.60 (FTE)
- Grades: 9-12
- Average class size: 20
- Student to teacher ratio: 22.02
- Colors: Purple & Gold
- Athletics conference: Southwestern Buckeye League
- Mascot: Golden Eagles
- Team name: Bellbrook Golden Eagles
- Rivals: Valley View Spartans, Oakwood Lumberjacks, Alter Knights
- USNWR ranking: 41st in the state of Ohio
- National ranking: 946 (US News & World Report)
- Newspaper: Eagle View News
- Website: www.sugarcreek.k12.oh.us/BHS.aspx

Bellbrook High School is a public high school in Sugarcreek Township / Bellbrook, Ohio area in the United States. It is the four year high school of the Bellbrook-Sugarcreek Local School District, which is rated Excellent by the Ohio Department of Education. The school serves grades 9–12. Their mascot is the Golden Eagle and their colors are purple and gold. Their primary athletic rivals are Oakwood and Valley View.

== Athletics ==
From 2002-2005, Bellbrook football went to the OHSAA playoffs four consecutive years. Some notable individuals are Luke Clemens (Miami Redhawks) and Austin Spitler (Ohio State Buckeyes & Miami Dolphins). Women’s basketball has also been doing very well of late winning 1 out of the past 2 South Western Buckeye League titles. In 2012, the women’s basketball team also made it to the state semi-final game in Columbus, Ohio. In the state semi-final game they would lose to eventual state champion Hathaway Brown from Cleveland, Ohio. The women’s basketball team was the first team that had been to state for Bellbrook since 1976 when the women's basketball team made it to the Final Four in Columbus for the first OHSAA women's basketball state tournament. Cameron Kelly became Bellbrook's first wrestling state champ in 2012. Kelly won the Division II Championship at the 106-pound weight class. Currently, the head of the athletics department is Bellbrook alum Charlie O’Dell.

== Band ==
The Bellbrook band program has been very successful bringing home numerous Bands Of America (BOA) regional and national titles. They were national champions in class A 1994, 1995, 1998, 1999, 2000, 2001, 2013 and were class AA champions in 2004. In 2000 they were the only class A band to compete in the finals event. Every year the Bellbrook Marching Eagles make at least two trips to BOA regional’s throughout the United States and then they end the year with a big trip to Indianapolis, Indiana for BOA Grand Nationals. The Marching Eagles have about 100 kids in the marching program each year - including winds, percussion, and color guard. The Bellbrook High School also has an award-winning Indoor Percussion Ensemble directed by Cammy Halls along with a world class Winterguard that won WGI in 2013 in the Scholastic A class division and received second place in 2015 in the Scholastic Open division directed by Sheldon Apo. Both compete at a national level each year.

== Notable alumni ==
- Deanna Brooks, Playboy Playmate, May 1998
- Austin Spitler, former NFL linebacker

== Community service ==
Bellbrook High School has a number of community service organizations such as National Honor Society (NHS), Partnership for Success (PFS), The Hopeful Squad, as well as numerous other small group projects done throughout the school year.

In previous years the students have organized a “Battle of the Bands” and charged a small admission. All the proceeds of this event went to a school in Chile to help build part of their school as well as supply them with the books and proper school supplies they would need to succeed in their academics. In 2011 the school received a visit from 12 students, which went to the sponsored school in Chile, and they stayed with host families and participated in the first “Global Day” in Bellbrook High School. Here the visiting students from Chile performed a native dance and gave some speeches to help raise global awareness.

One of the biggest student-run community service acts was done in 2009 by way of a “Beatles Benefit Concert” for Mr. Grushon, a teacher at the High School, that at the time had cancer. A group of seniors worked together for months practicing the Beatles music, the Beatles were Mr. Grushon’s favorite band, and performed it on April 10, 2009 in front of a sold out auditorium at Bellbrook High School. This was the first time in school history that the auditorium had been sold out for a school related event. The show lasted about three hours in length and was able to raise $5,700 to help the teacher and his family pay for medical expenses. These students later performed another show at an outdoor venue in Beavercreek, Ohio and were able to raise another $3,500 for the family.
