= Evan Schwartz (soccer) =

American soccer player

Personal information
- Date of birth: October 27, 1987 (age 39)
- Place of birth: Steamboat Springs, Colorado, United States
- Height: 5 ft 11 in (1.80 m)
- Position: Defender

Youth career
- 2001–2006: IMG Academy
- 2007: Darlington Soccer Academy
- 2007: Chicago Fire (Super-20)

Senior career*
| Years | Team | Apps | (Gls) |
| 2008 | Afturelding | 22 | (6) |
| 2009 | Breiðablik UBK | 3 | (0) |
| 2010–2011 | Dayton Dutch Lions | 47 | (0) |
| 2012 | Knattspyrnufélagið Víkingur | 24 | (3) |
- * Club domestic league appearances and goals as of February 12, 2012

Evan Schwartz (born October 27, 1987) is an American former soccer player.

== Career ==
=== Europe ===
Born in Steamboat Springs, Colorado, Schwartz began his youth career at IMG Academy and went on to play for the Chicago Fire Super 20 side. After not receiving interest from Major League Soccer sides Schwartz left the United States for Iceland and signed with Third Level side Afturelding. He helped the club gain promotion to 1. deild karla, the second division in the Icelandic football league system. His play with Afturelding led to Schwartz receiving interest from several Úrvalsdeild clubs, and he subsequently signed with Breiðablik UBK in 2009. In 2012, he signed with Vikingur R, starting 24 games and tallying 3 goals and 11 assists.

=== United States ===
Having suffered through several injuries Schwartz saw limited playing time with Breiðablik, and returned to the United States in 2010. He signed with the Dayton Dutch Lions in the USL Premier Development League, establishing himself as the club's starting right back during the 2010 season. Schwartz was noted for his attacking prowess from his right back position and began to draw interest from several Major League Soccer clubs including Toronto FC, Colorado Rapids and New England Revolution. Schwartz re-signed with Dayton, now part of the USL Pro league, on March 31, 2011.

== Honors ==
Breiðablik UBK

- Icelandic Cup: 2009
