= Dick van Eijmeren =

Dutch footballer

Personal information
- Full name: Dick van Eijmeren
- Date of birth: April 2, 1990 (age 36)
- Place of birth: Netherlands
- Height: 6 ft 0 in (1.83 m)
- Position: Defender

Youth career
- MVV '27
- Excelsior Maassluis

Senior career*
Years	Team	Apps	(Gls)
2008–2010	NAC	0	(0)
2010–2011	Capelle	1	(0)
2011–2011	Dayton Dutch Lions	8	(0)
2011–2012	Capelle		
2012–2014	Excelsior Maassluis		
- * Club domestic league appearances and goals as of April 2, 2012

Dick van Eijmeren (Dutch pronunciation: [ˈdɪk fɑn ˈɛimərə(n)]; (Note: In isolation, van is pronounced [vɑn].) born April 2, 1990) is a Dutch retired footballer.

== Club career ==
=== Netherlands ===
Van Eijmeren played for Dutch senior youth side MVV '27, and was part of the youth system of senior amateur team Excelsior Maassluis, before turning professional with Eredivisie side NAC Breda in 2008. Van Eijmeren played extensively with Breda's reserves, but never made a first team appearance, and moved to vv Capelle in the Topklasse in 2010–11.

=== United States ===
Van Eijmeren moved to the United States in 2011 to play for the Dayton Dutch Lions in the USL Professional Division in 2011. He made his debut for the Lions on April 23, 2011, in a 3–2 loss to the Rochester Rhinos.

Van Eijmeren retired in 2014 due to injury, while playing for Excelsior Maassluis again.
