= Washington Mills, Ohio =

Unincorporated community in Ohio, U.S.

Coordinates: 39°38′51″N 84°02′49″W

Washington Mills is an unincorporated community in Greene County, in the U.S. state of Ohio.

== History ==
The namesake Washington Mills consisted of a sawmill and gristmill built on the site at the Little Miami River in the 1830s.
