= Lucien Seymour =

Dutch footballer

Personal information
- Full name: Lucien Seymour
- Date of birth: 1 July 1983 (age 43)
- Place of birth: Netherlands
- Height: 5 ft 9 in (1.75 m)
- Position: Forward

Team information
- Current team: RVVH Ridderkerk

Senior career*
Years	Team	Apps	(Gls)
- Excelsior Rotterdam
- RBC Roosendaal
- SVV-SMC
- VVV Venlo
?–2008	Deltasport		
2008–2010	RVVH Ridderkerk		
2011	Dayton Dutch Lions	17	(1)
2011–	RVVH Ridderkerk		
- * Club domestic league appearances and goals as of 2 April 2012

Lucien Seymour (born 1 July 1983) is a Dutch footballer currently playing for RVVH Ridderkerk.

== Career ==
=== Netherlands ===
Seymour played extensively at all levels of the Dutch football system, having played for Excelsior Rotterdam, RBC Roosendaal, SVV-SMC, VVV-Venlo, Deltasport and RVVH Ridderkerk.

=== United States ===
Seymour moved to the United States in 2011 to play for the Dayton Dutch Lions in the USL Professional Division in 2011.
