= Bas Ent =

Dutch footballer (born 1987)

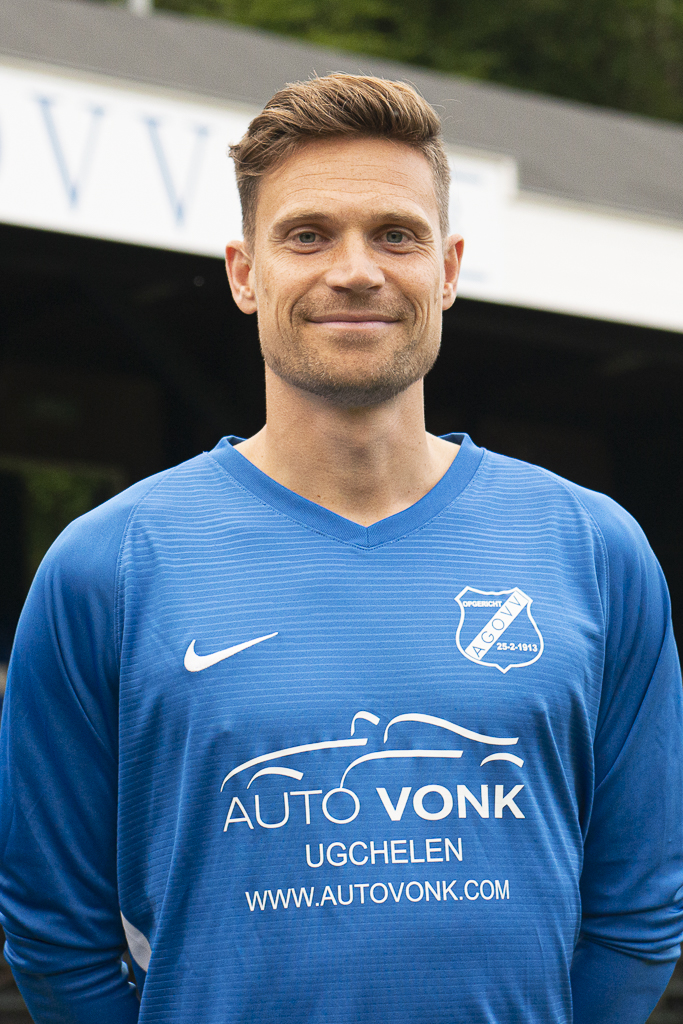
- Ent with AGOVV in 2019

Personal information
- Full name: Bas Ent
- Date of birth: 28 September 1987 (age 39)
- Place of birth: Zaandijk, Netherlands
- Height: 6 ft 1 in (1.85 m)
- Position: Midfielder

Youth career
- VVZ Zaandam
- 2001: KFC
- 2001–2006: FC Volendam

Senior career*
Years	Team	Apps	(Gls)
2006–2009	FC Volendam	5	(0)
2009–2010	Katwijk	0	(0)
2010	Dayton Dutch Lions	16	(2)
2010–2011	Katwijk	8	(1)
2011–2012	FC Lisse	21	(2)
2012–2013	Katwijk		
2013–2014	AFC		
2014–2015	ODIN '59		
2015–2016	DOVO		
2016–2018	NSC Nijkerk		
2019–2020	AGOVV		
2020–2025	Hercules Zaandam		

International career
2003	Netherlands U-17	6	(0)
- * Club domestic league appearances and goals

Bas Ent (born 28 September 1987 in Zaanstad) is a Dutch retired footballer.

== Club career ==
Ent made his professional debut for FC Volendam on 21 April 2006 in an Eerste Divisie away match against Helmond Sport. Ent played ten games during his three-year professional contract in which he did not score. He also had a serious knee injury during his time with FC Volendam which curtailed his progress. He then joined VV Katwijk in 2009 and attended a college program at the Johan Cruyff University.

From May to July 2010, Ent played in the USL Premier Development League in the United States for the Dayton Dutch Lions appearing in 16 league matches in which he scored 2 goals and assisted on 6 others. During his time with Dayton, Ent attracted the interest of several Major League Soccer clubs, and in July 2010, he was given trials with Major League Soccer teams Toronto FC and Columbus Crew. He appeared for Toronto FC in an international friendly against Bolton Wanderers in 2010.

In January 2011, Ent rejoined Toronto FC on trial for their pre-season in Antalya, Turkey. On 20 March 2011 he signed with Topklasse club FC Lisse and continued playing in the Dutch top amateur leagues.

== International career ==
Ent played six times for the Netherlands U-17, but never made it to a senior squad.
