= Marvin van der Pluijm =

Dutch footballer

Personal information
- Date of birth: 1 June 1988 (age 38)
- Place of birth: Rotterdam, Netherlands
- Height: 1.85 m (6 ft 1 in)
- Position: Attacking midfielder

Team information
- Current team: SC Feyenoord

Youth career
- VV Alexandria '66
- Sparta Rotterdam

Senior career*
Years	Team	Apps	(Gls)
2009–2010	Den Bosch	12	(0)
2010–2011	NAC Breda	1	(1)
2011	Dayton Dutch Lions	19	(1)
2011–2012	Barendrecht	16	(4)
2012–2013	VV Capelle	3	(0)
2013–2014	Jodan Boys		
2014–2015	Barendrecht	18	(0)
2015–2023	Spijkenisse	21	(4)
2023–2024	XerxesDZB		
2024–	SC Feyenoord		
- * Club domestic league appearances and goals as of 17 November 2024

Marvin van der Pluijm (born 1 June 1988) is a Dutch professional footballer who plays as a midfielder for SC Feyenoord in the Vierde Divisie.

== Career ==
=== Netherlands ===
van der Pluijm was part of the youth setup at his hometown team, Sparta Rotterdam, and played for Dutch senior youth side VV Alexandria '66, before turning professional with FC Den Bosch in the Dutch Eerste Divisie in 2009. He played 12 games for Den Bosch before moving to Eredivisie side NAC Breda in 2010. He scored his first professional goal in his only game for Breda, a 2-2 tie with NEC Nijmegen on 22 January 2011. After his move to the Dayton Dutch Lions he joined BVV Barendrecht in that same year.

=== United States ===
van der Pluijm moved to the United States in 2011 to play for the Dayton Dutch Lions in the USL Professional Division in 2011.
