= Sugarcreek Township, Greene County, Ohio =

Township in Ohio, US

- Township
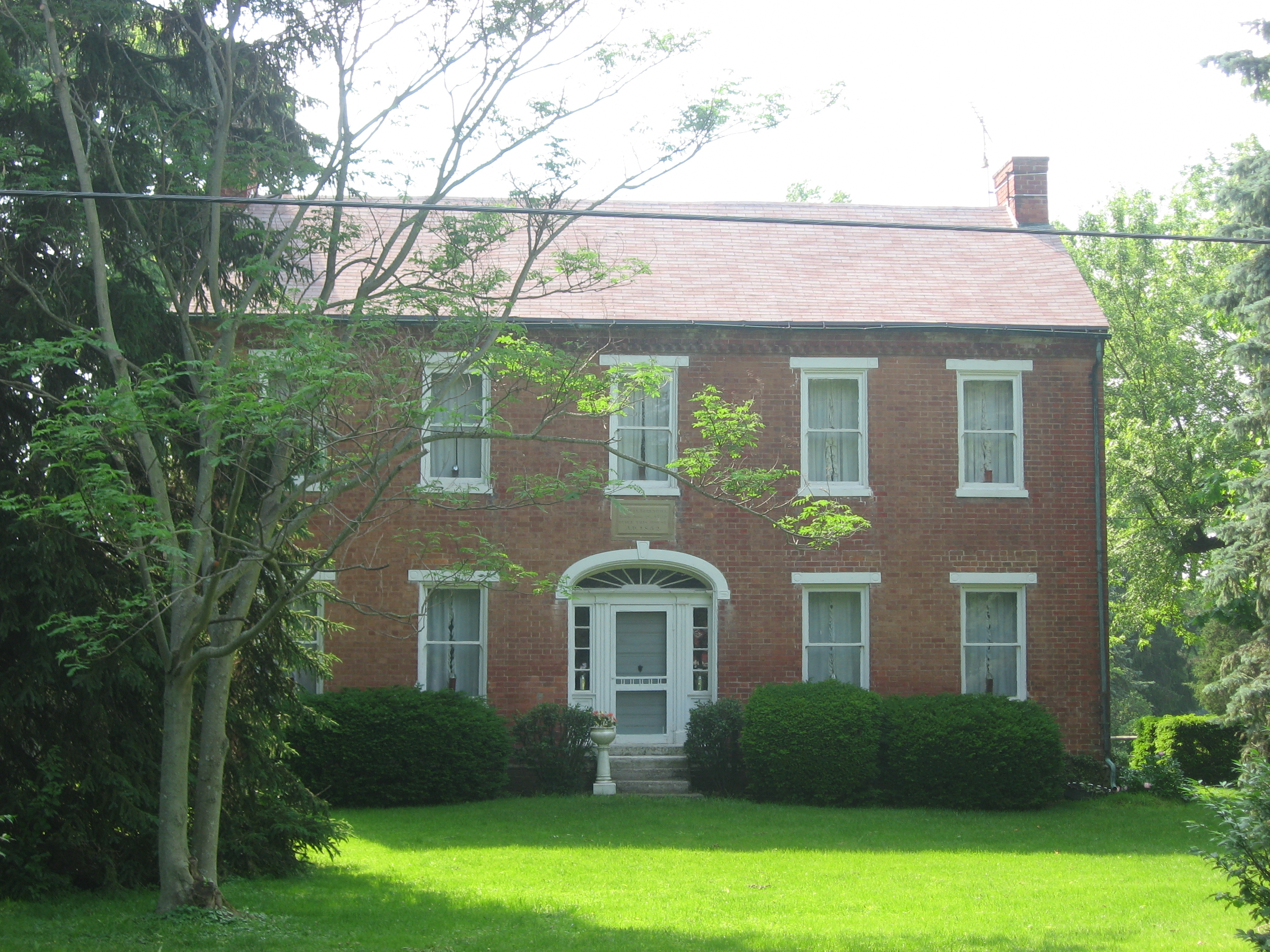
- The Berryhill-Morris House, built 1832

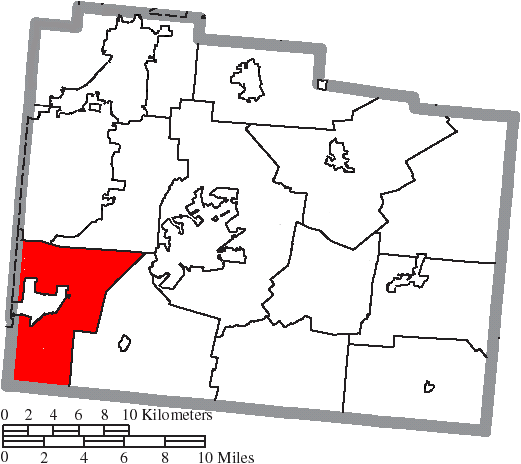
- Location of Sugarcreek Township in Greene County
- Coordinates: 39°38′42″N 84°4′54″W
- Country: United States
- State: Ohio
- County: Greene

Area
  - Total: 26.6 sq mi (68.9 km^{2})
  - Land: 26.4 sq mi (68.4 km^{2})
  - Water: 0.19 sq mi (0.5 km^{2})
- Elevation: 807 ft (246 m)

Population (2020)
  - Total: 9,534
  - Density: 361/sq mi (139/km^{2})
- Time zone: UTC-5 (Eastern (EST))
  - Summer (DST): UTC-4 (EDT)
- FIPS code: 39-75201
- GNIS feature ID: 1086174
- Website: www.sugarcreektownship.com

Sugarcreek Township is one of the twelve townships of Greene County, Ohio, United States. As of the 2020 census, the population was 9,534.

== Geography ==
Located in the southwestern corner of the county, it borders the following townships and city:

- Beavercreek Township - north
- Spring Valley Township - east
- Wayne Township, Warren County - south
- Washington Township, Montgomery County - west
- Kettering - northwest

Three cities are located in Sugarcreek Township: Bellbrook in the west, a small part of Centerville in the west-northwest, and small part of Kettering in the northwest.

== Name and history ==
Sugarcreek Township was established in 1803. The township was named for its Sugar Creek, a tributary of the Little Miami River. It is the only Sugarcreek Township statewide, although there are five Sugar Creek Townships.

== Government ==
The township is governed by a three-member board of trustees, who are elected in November of odd-numbered years to a four-year term beginning on the following January 1. Two are elected in the year after the presidential election and one is elected in the year before it. There is also an elected township fiscal officer, who serves a four-year term beginning on April 1 of the year after the election, which is held in November of the year before the presidential election. Vacancies in the fiscal officership or on the board of trustees are filled by the remaining trustees.

The township has a police department.

== Notable resident ==
- Brock Turner, convicted rapist
