= Luke Magill =

English footballer

Personal information
- Date of birth: 10 September 1987 (age 39)
- Place of birth: Dagenham, England
- Positions: Defender; midfielder

Team information
- Current team: Dayton Dutch Lions
- Number: 17

Youth career
- 2005–2007: Bolton Wanderers

College career
Years	Team	Apps	(Gls)
2007	South Florida Bulls	10	(1)
2009–2010	Lynn Fighting Knights	31	(1)

Senior career*
Years	Team	Apps	(Gls)
2010	Long Island Rough Riders	9	(2)
2010	Baton Rouge Capitals	1	(0)
2011–	Dayton Dutch Lions	12	(0)
- * Club domestic league appearances and goals as of 12 February 2012

Luke Magill (born 10 September 1987) is an English footballer, who plays for Dayton Dutch Lions in the USL Professional Division.

== Career ==
=== Youth and amateur ===
Magill played in the youth team of English Premier League club Bolton Wanderers, before coming to the United States in 2007 after being offered a college soccer scholarship by the University of South Florida. After taking a year out in 2008, he transferred to Lynn University prior to his sophomore year, playing in 19 games and scoring one goal during his first year with the college.

During his college years he also played with the Long Island Rough Riders and the Baton Rouge Capitals in the USL Premier Development League, helping the Capitals to the PDL national semi-finals in 2010.

=== Professional ===
Magill left school early and turned professional in 2011 when he signed with the Dayton Dutch Lions in the USL Professional Division. He made his professional debut on 16 April 2011 in Dayton's first game of the 2011 season, a 2–1 loss to Charleston Battery.
