= Mettin Copier =

Austrian footballer

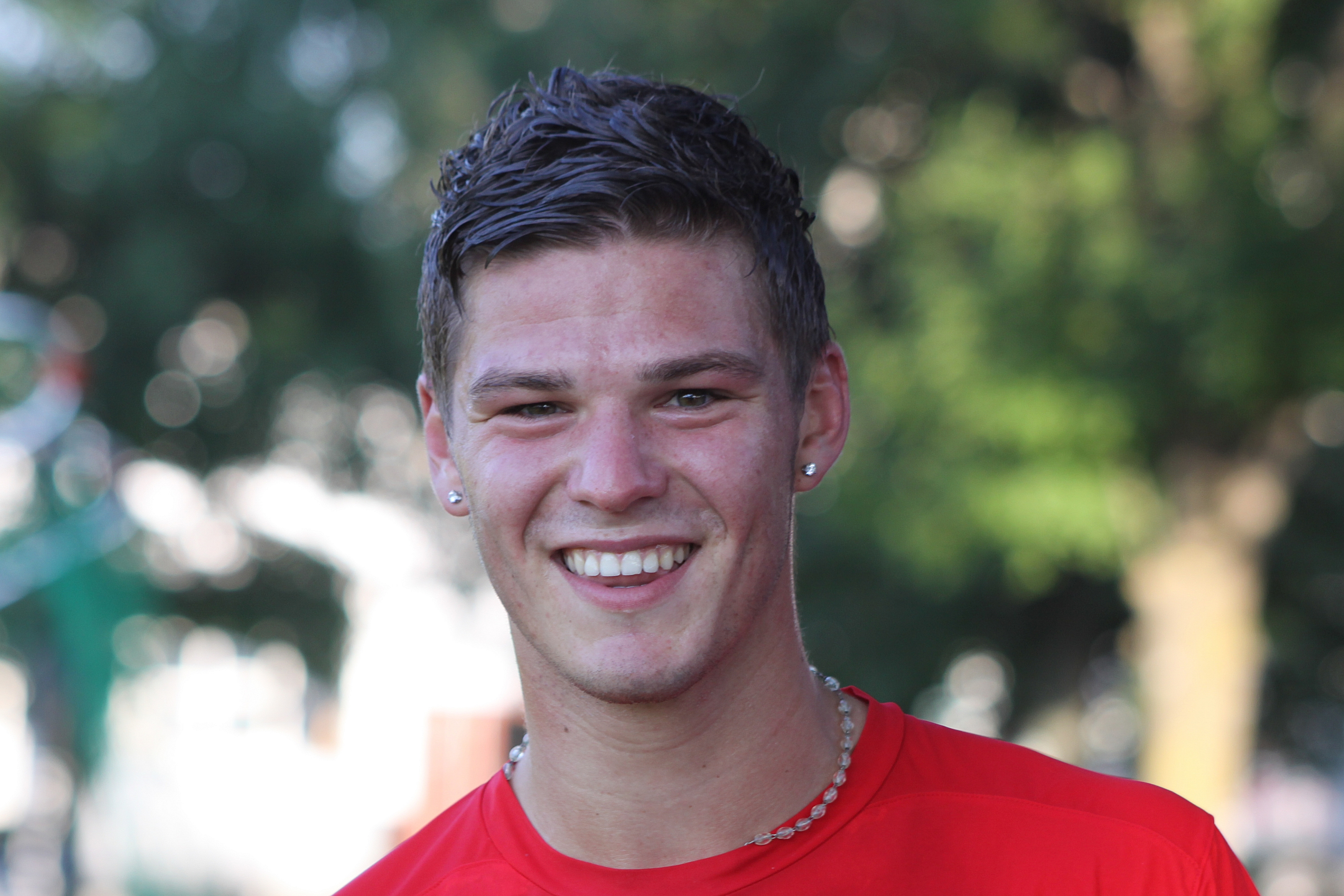

Personal information
- Full name: Mettin Copier
- Date of birth: 4 January 1989 (age 37)
- Place of birth: Amsterdam, Netherlands
- Height: 6 ft 3 in (1.91 m)
- Position: Defender

Team information
- Current team: TV Leinburg

Youth career
- –2006: SV Siveo '60
- 2007: Elinkwijk
- 2007–2009: AZ

Senior career*
Years	Team	Apps	(Gls)
2009–2010	AZ	0	(0)
2010	→ Telstar (loan)	4	(0)
2010–2011	FC Oss	3	(2)
2011–2012	Dayton Dutch Lions	42	(4)
2012–2014	Leonidas	18	(3)
2014–2015	Breukelen		
2017–2019	ASV Fürth	39	(7)
2019–2022	SG Quelle Fürth	23	(1)
2022–2025	SC 04 Schwabach	86	(6)
2025	TSV Buch	13	(0)
2026–	TV Leinburg		

International career
2009	Austria U21	2	(0)
- * Club domestic league appearances and goals as of 29 November 2020

Mettin Copier (born 4 January 1989) is a Dutch-born Austrian footballer who plays for TV Leinburg in the German amateur leagues.

== Club career ==
Copier played for youth teams SV Siveo'60 and USV Elinkwijk, before joining the academy of Dutch Eredivisie side AZ Alkmaar in 2007. He played extensively for Alkmaar's reserves, and was promoted to the senior team in 2009. After a short period on loan at Telstar in the Eerste Divisie in 2010, during which he played four games but found himself marginalized following a change of manager, Copier moved to FC Oss in 2010, playing 3 games and scoring 2 games for the team.

Copier moved to the United States in 2011 to play for the Dayton Dutch Lions in the USL Professional Division in 2011.

In summer 2014 he joined FC Breukelen from fellow amateurs RKSV Leonidas, in Rotterdam.

In November 2017, Copier moved to seventh-tier Bezirksliga Mittelfranken 1 club ASV Fürth. Ahead of the 2019–20 season, he moved to the sixth-tier Landesliga Bayern-Nordost club SG Quelle Fürth.

=== International ===
Copier, whose father is Dutch and whose mother is Austrian, announced his intention to play for the Austria national football team in 2007. He received his first cap for the Austria national under-21 football team on 25 March 2009 in a game against Italy, and six days later played his second game in a 2-1 loss to Switzerland.
