= Ryan Heins =

American soccer player (born 1985)

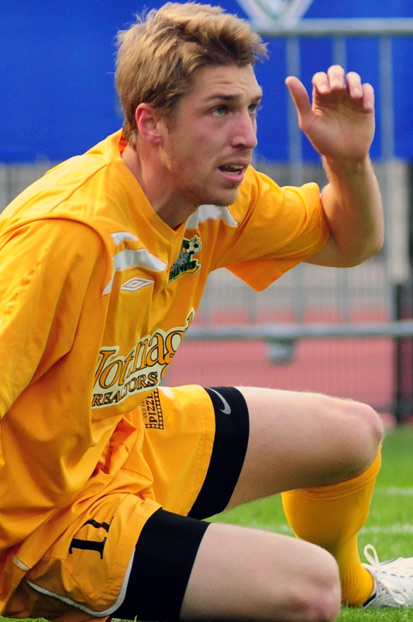

Personal information
- Date of birth: March 1, 1985 (age 41)
- Place of birth: Medford, New Jersey, United States
- Height: 6 ft 2 in (1.88 m)
- Positions: Defender; midfielder

College career
Years	Team	Apps	(Gls)
2004–2007	Temple Owls	75	(7)

Senior career*
Years	Team	Apps	(Gls)
2003–2007	Ocean City Barons	66	(11)
2007–2010	Philadelphia Kixx (indoor)	61	(17)
2008	Harrisburg City Islanders	17	(7)
2008	→ Rochester Rhinos (loan)	7	(1)
2009–2010	Rochester Rhinos	51	(5)
2011–2013	Richmond Kickers	40	(6)
Total		242	(47)

Managerial career
- 2013: Richmond Spiders (women's assistant)
- * Club domestic league appearances and goals

Ryan Heins (born March 1, 1985) is an American former professional soccer player.

== Career ==
=== College and amateur ===
Heins played four years of college soccer at Temple University, serving as team captain in his senior year. During his college career he played in 75 games, scoring 7 goals and 11 assists, along with earning All-Atlantic rookie honors his freshman year, All-Atlantic 10 honors his senior year, and Philadelphia Soccer 7 honors.

Heins also played five seasons with the Ocean City Barons of the USL Premier Development League. In 2007, he was named the club's captain and Most Valuable Player. He scored 11 goals and contributed 12 assists in 66 games with Ocean City. He also played in six Lamar Hunt US Open Cup games during his PDL career, helping the Barons reach the third round in 2005 by upsetting the Long Island Rough Riders of the USL Second Division 4–0. Heins had an assist in that game. He also helped Ocean City upset Crystal Palace Baltimore of the USL Second Division 1–0 in the first round in 2007.

=== Professional ===
Heins was the first selection for the Philadelphia Kixx in the MISL's expansion draft. After spending one season with Philadelphia he was signed by the Harrisburg City Islanders of the USL Second Division. He led the team with seven goals and recorded one assist during the regular season. He also scored a goal in the first round of the 2008 league playoffs, but lost in a penalty kick shootout to Crystal Palace Baltimore.

Following the Harrisburg City Islanders season, he was loaned to the Rochester Rhinos of the USL First Division. While on loan, Ryan show his versatility by playing forward, midfield and defense. He scored his first USL-1 goal at home against Portland. After the season ended he signed a contract with the Rhinos and then returned to play the indoor season for the Kixx. Ryan helped the 2009 Rhinos reach the U.S. Open Cup semi-finals by finishing the winning penalty shot in a quarter final upset victory over the Columbus Crew. He stayed with Rochester through the 2010 season.

On March 23, 2011, Heins signed with Richmond Kickers of the USL Pro league. In his first season with the club, the team advanced to the Semifinals of the Lamar Hunt U.S. Open Cup. In their amazing run, which Heins was a main contributor, the Richmond Kickers defeated the Columbus Crew 2-1 and Sporting Kansas City 2–0, eventually falling to Chicago Fire. The club re-signed Heins for the 2012 season on November 22, 2011.

=== Media career ===
Heins has been a consistent member of the broadcast team for Richmond Kickers during their 2013 USL Pro season providing color commentary. Heins is heavily linked with the Richmond podcast and radio show Total Soccer Show that airs twice weekly on WRIR-LP.

== Personal ==
Ryan is the brother of actor Trevor Heins, who has been in movies such as Totally Awesome, Gracie and The Love Guru, and television shows such as Rescue Me and Wonder Showzen.

== Honors ==
=== Rochester Rhinos ===
- USSF Division 2 Pro League Regular Season Champions (1): 2010
