= Bellbrook, Ohio =

- City
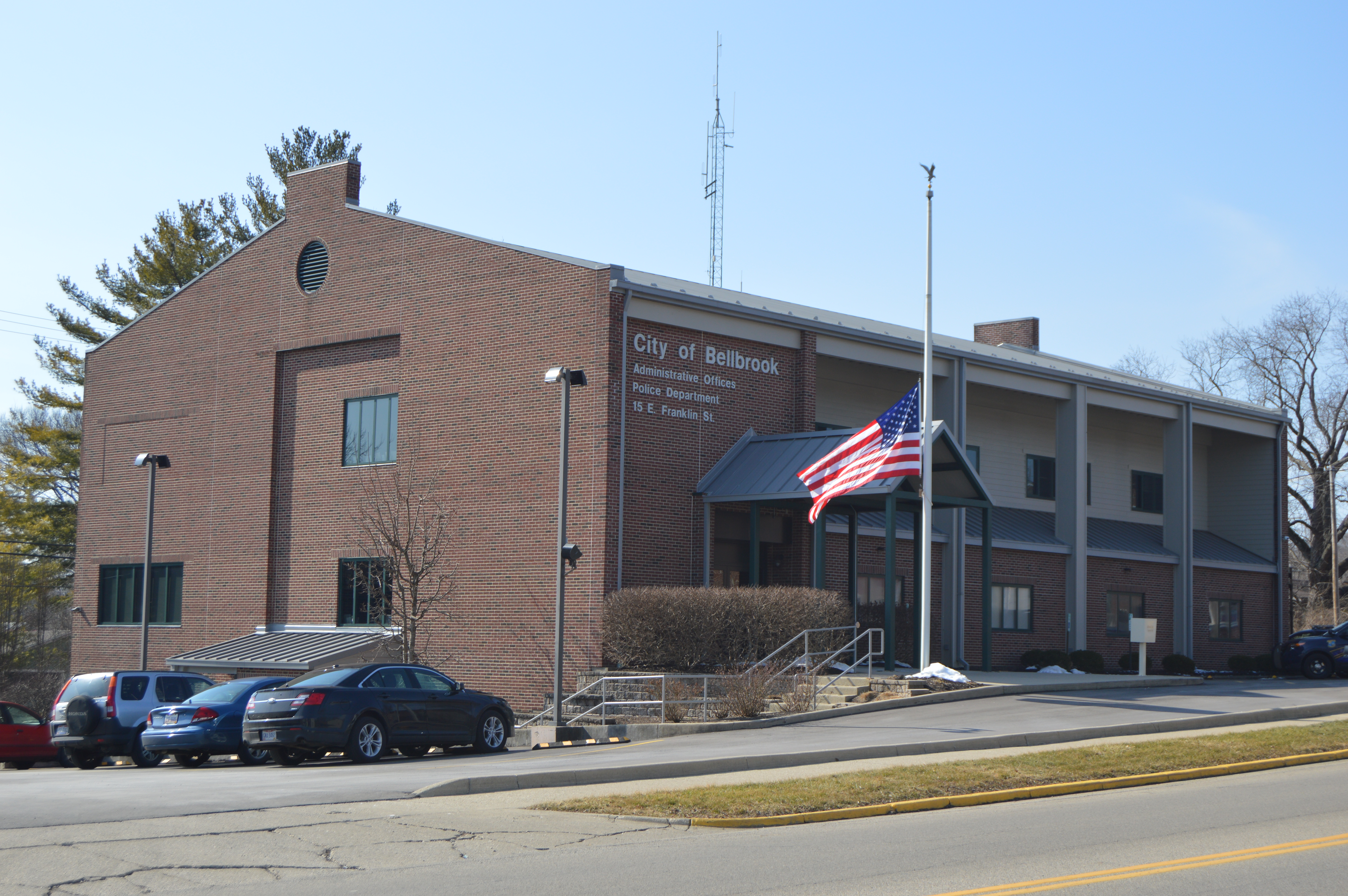
- City Hall on Franklin Street, downtown

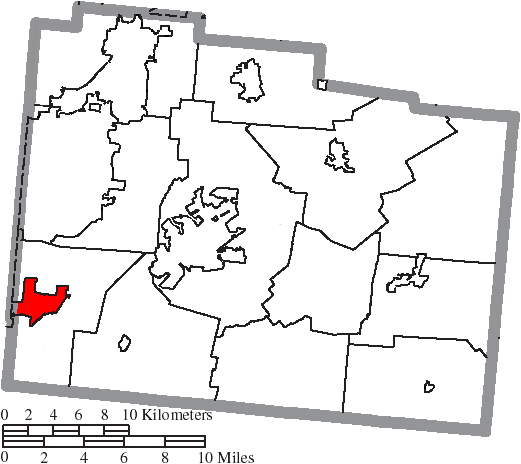
- Location of Bellbrook in Greene County

- Location within Ohio Location within the United States
- Coordinates: 39°38′00″N 84°5′18″W
- Country: United States
- State: Ohio
- County: Greene

Government
  - Type: Council-Manager
  - Mayor: Mike Schweller

Area
  - Total: 3.14 sq mi (8.12 km^{2})
  - Land: 3.14 sq mi (8.12 km^{2})
  - Water: 0 sq mi (0.00 km^{2})
- Elevation: 902 ft (275 m)

Population (2020)
  - Total: 7,317
  - Estimate (2023): 7,409
  - Density: 2,334/sq mi (901.1/km^{2})
- Time zone: UTC-5 (Eastern (EST))
  - Summer (DST): UTC-4 (EDT)
- ZIP code: 45305
- Area codes: 937, 326
- FIPS code: 39-05102
- GNIS feature ID: 2394111
- Website: https://www.bellbrook.gov/

Bellbrook is a city in Greene County, Ohio, United States. The population was 7,317 at the 2020 census. It is part of the Dayton Metropolitan Statistical Area. It sits about 10.7 miles (17.2 km) southeast of Dayton.

== History ==
Bellbrook was laid out in 1816. The name Bellbrook is an amalgamation of the name one of the city's founders, Stephen Bell, and Little Sugar Creek. A post office called Bell Brook was established in 1817, and the name was changed to Bellbrook in 1895.

Initially a village, Bellbrook grew by way of annexation of territory from surrounding Sugarcreek Township. The first annexation, in 1970, helped push the population over 5,000 and led to Bellbrook achieving city status in 1974. With large amounts of build-able land, the area added over 1,000 housing units since the annexation. Today the city is largely developed with little land left for future development. Most of the development is taking place in neighboring Sugarcreek Township.

== Geography ==
According to the 2010 census, the city has a total area of 3.13 square miles (8.1 km^{2}), all land. Bellbrook has a population density of 2,372 people per square mile.

== Demographics ==
Historical population
Census	Pop.	Note	%±
1850	502		—
1860	510		1.6%
1870	369		−27.6%
1880	425		15.2%
1890	350		−17.6%
1900	352		0.6%
1910	283		−19.6%
1920	286		1.1%
1930	389		36.0%
1940	410		5.4%
1950	425		3.7%
1960	941		121.4%
1970	1,268		34.8%
1980	5,174		308.0%
1990	6,511		25.8%
2000	7,009		7.6%
2010	6,943		−0.9%
2020	7,317		5.4%
2023 (est.)	7,409		1.3%

=== 2020 census ===
As of the 2020 census, Bellbrook had a population of 7,317. The median age was 42.0 years. 22.9% of residents were under the age of 18 and 18.8% of residents were 65 years of age or older. For every 100 females there were 95.1 males, and for every 100 females age 18 and over there were 94.9 males age 18 and over.

100.0% of residents lived in urban areas, while 0% lived in rural areas.

There were 2,944 households in Bellbrook, of which 30.9% had children under the age of 18 living in them. Of all households, 59.8% were married-couple households, 14.2% were households with a male householder and no spouse or partner present, and 21.0% were households with a female householder and no spouse or partner present. About 23.5% of all households were made up of individuals and 9.8% had someone living alone who was 65 years of age or older.

There were 3,032 housing units, of which 2.9% were vacant. Among occupied housing units, 80.5% were owner-occupied and 19.5% were renter-occupied. The homeowner vacancy rate was 0.8% and the rental vacancy rate was 2.4%.

Racial composition as of the 2020 census
Race	Number	Percent
White	6,540	89.4%
Black or African American	126	1.7%
American Indian and Alaska Native	19	0.3%
Asian	142	1.9%
Native Hawaiian and Other Pacific Islander	0	0%
Some other race	46	0.6%
Two or more races	444	6.1%
Hispanic or Latino (of any race)	194	2.7%

=== 2010 census ===
As of the census of 2010, there were 6,943 people, 2,767 households, and 2,068 families living in the city. The population density was 2,218.2 inhabitants per square mile (856.5/km^{2}). There were 2,914 housing units at an average density of 931.0 per square mile (359.5/km^{2}). The racial makeup of the city was 96.0% White, 1.3% African American, 0.3% Native American, 0.7% Asian, 0.4% from other races, and 1.3% from two or more races. Hispanic or Latino of any race were 2.1% of the population.

There were 2,767 households, of which 33.2% had children under the age of 18 living with them, 62.4% were married couples living together, 8.5% had a female householder with no husband present, 3.8% had a male householder with no wife present, and 25.3% were non-families. 21.6% of all households were made up of individuals, and 7.5% had someone living alone who was 65 years of age or older. The average household size was 2.51 and the average family size was 2.93.

The median age in the city was 42.5 years. 23.9% of residents were under the age of 18; 6.1% were between the ages of 18 and 24; 23.8% were from 25 to 44; 33.2% were from 45 to 64; and 12.9% were 65 years of age or older. The gender makeup of the city was 49.4% male and 50.6% female.

=== 2000 census ===
As of the census of 2000, there were 7,009 people, 2,222 households, and 2,022 families living in the city. The population density was 2,244.4 inhabitants per square mile (866.6/km^{2}). There were 3,120 housing units at an average density of 861.1 per square mile (332.5/km^{2}). The racial makeup of the city was 97.19% White, 0.78% African American, 0.30% Native American, 0.98% Asian, 0.03% Pacific Islander, 0.11% from other races, and 0.60% from two or more races. Hispanic or Latino of any race were 1.20% of the population.

There were 2,596 households, out of which 39.8% had children under the age of 18 living with them, 68.0% were married couples living together, 7.0% had a female householder with no husband present, and 22.1% were non-families. 18.8% of all households were made up of individuals, and 5.9% had someone living alone who was 65 years of age or older. The average household size was 2.70 and the average family size was 3.11.

In the city the population was spread out, with 28.0% under the age of 18, 6.6% from 18 to 24, 31.4% from 25 to 44, 24.7% from 45 to 64, and 9.2% who were 65 years of age or older. The median age was 37 years. For every 100 females, there were 97.9 males. For every 100 females age 18 and over, there were 95.9 males.

The median income for a household in the city was $62,794, and the median income for a family was $69,770. Males had a median income of $51,311 versus $35,184 for females. The per capita income for the city was $26,183. About 1.7% of families and 2.3% of the population were below the poverty line, including 2.8% of those under age 18 and 4.5% of those age 65 or over.

== Government ==
Bellbrook is governed by a council-manager form of administration. The city manager is appointed by a council, while the council is elected for four-year terms, and the mayor for two-year terms, in non-partisan elections.

== Arts and culture ==
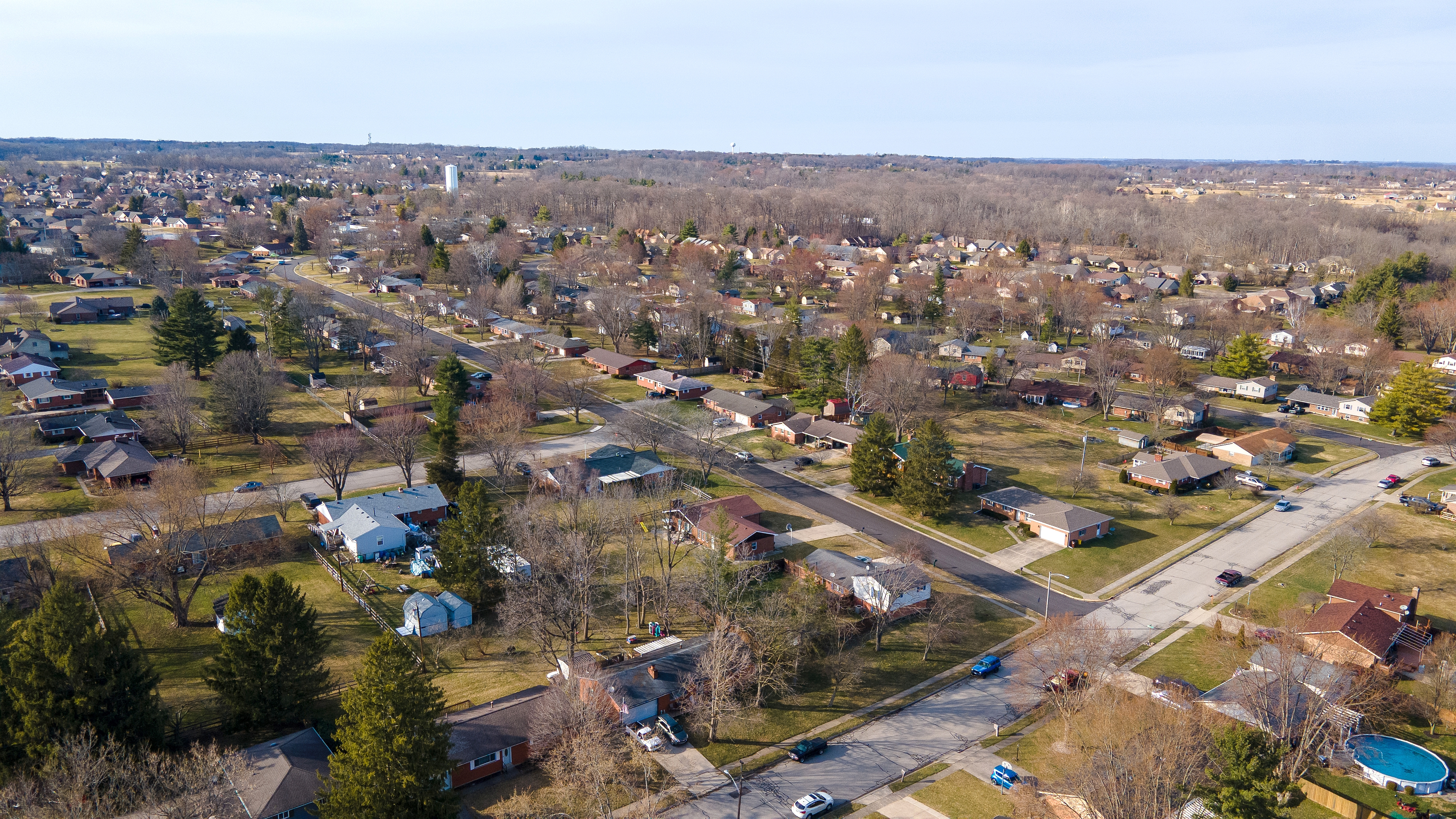
Bellbrook in 2021

The city holds a Sugar Maple Festival every April and a Lions Club Festival every August.

Bellbrook has a public library, a branch of the Greene County Public Library.

The Bellbrook Historical Museum, located at 42 North Main Street, offers a collection of history from information and objects dating back over the past several hundred years.

== Education ==
Bellbrook has five school buildings as part of the Sugarcreek Local School District:

- Stephen Bell Elementary, grades K–2
- Bell Creek Intermediate, grades 3–5
- Bellbrook Middle School, grades 6–8
- Bellbrook High School, grades 9–12
- Sugarcreek Education Center, alternate education

== Notable people ==
- Erma Bombeck, writer
- Austin Spitler, NFL player
- Jonathan Winters, actor and comedian
