= Jesper Leerdam =

Dutch footballer (born 1987)

Personal information
- Full name: Jesper Leerdam
- Date of birth: 17 April 1987 (age 39)
- Place of birth: Hook of Holland, Netherlands
- Height: 6 ft 0 in (1.83 m)
- Position: Goalkeeper

Youth career
- VV Hoek van Holland

Senior career*
Years	Team	Apps	(Gls)
- ADO Den Haag
2006–2007	Vitesse Delft		
2007–2010	's-Gravenzandse SV		
2010–2011	VV Capelle		
2011–2011	Dayton Dutch Lions	18	(0)
2011–2016	Excelsior Maassluis		
2016–2018	SVV Scheveningen		
- * Club domestic league appearances and goals as of October 22, 2023

Jesper Leerdam (born 17 April 1987) is a former Dutch footballer. He last played for SVV Scheveningen.

== Career ==
=== Netherlands ===
Leerdam played extensively at all levels of the Dutch football system, having played for VV Hoek van Holland, RKVV Westlandia, ADO Den Haag, Vitesse Delft, 's-Gravenzandse SV and VV Capelle.

=== United States ===
Leerdam moved to the United States in 2011 to play for the Dayton Dutch Lions in the USL Professional Division in 2011.
