= FC Breukelen =

Dutch football club

- Full name: Footballclub Breukelen
- Founded: 1 June 2007
- Ground: Sportpark Broekdijk-Oost, Breukelen
- League: Eerste Klasse Saturday A (2019–20)
- Website: fcbreukelen.nl
Home colours

FC Breukelen is a football club from Breukelen, Netherlands. FC Breukelen plays in the 2018–19 Saturday Eerste Klasse A.

== History ==
The club was founded in 2007 form a merger between VV Nijenrodes in the Eerste Klasse en CSV Vitesse. CSV was usually a Vierde Klasse club but had played in the Derde Klasse in its last season. Nijenrodes had played just one season in the Hoofdklasse, in 1998–1999. It played in the national KNVB Cup of 1998–99 and 2000–01 in the group pools. In the 2005–06 KNVB Cup, PEC Zwolle beat VV Nijenrodes 7–0 in round 1.

In 2012 there was a major fight between players of both FC Breukelen and GHC and supporters of GHC on the football field.

FC Breukelen has spent two seasons in the Hoofdklasse, relegating at the end of each season, in 2015 and 2017. In 2018 it continued in the Eerste Klasse.
