= National Register of Historic Places listings in Greene County, Ohio =

Location of Greene County in Ohio

This is a list of the National Register of Historic Places listings in Greene County, Ohio.

This is intended to be a complete list of the properties and districts on the National Register of Historic Places in Greene County, Ohio, United States. The locations of National Register properties and districts for which the latitude and longitude coordinates are included below, may be seen in an online map.

There are 47 properties and districts listed on the National Register in the county, including 2 National Historic Landmarks. Another 2 properties were once listed but have been removed.

This National Park Service list is complete through NPS recent listings posted July 31, 2026.

== Current listings ==
	Name on the Register	Image	Date listed	Location	City or town	Description
1	Antioch College Fine Arts Building		June 6, 2022 (#100007761)	405 Corry St. 39°47′55″N 83°53′09″W	Yellow Springs	
2	Antioch Hall, North and South Halls	Antioch Hall, North and South Halls	June 30, 1975 (#75001411)	Along Hyde Rd. on the Antioch College campus 39°47′59″N 83°53′17″W	Yellow Springs	
3	Ballard Road Covered Bridge	Ballard Road Covered Bridge	May 29, 1975 (#75001408)	Northwest of Jamestown on Ballard Rd. over Caesars Creek; 39°40′41″N 83°48′55″W	New Jasper Township	1880s covered bridge, no longer open to through traffic
4	Bank of Xenia	Bank of Xenia	May 7, 1973 (#73001450)	Northeastern corner of Detroit and E. 2nd Sts. 39°41′02″N 83°55′44″W	Xenia	Greek Revival bank near downtown Xenia
5	George Barrett Concrete House	George Barrett Concrete House	April 10, 1986 (#86000699)	4 E. Main St. 39°36′32″N 84°00′30″W	Spring Valley	
6	Bath Township Consolidated School	Bath Township Consolidated School	September 22, 1983 (#83001974)	221 N. Central Ave. 39°49′32″N 84°01′17″W	Fairborn	
7	Berryhill-Morris House	Berryhill-Morris House	November 12, 1975 (#75001407)	South of Bellbrook at 3113 Ferry Rd. 39°36′15″N 84°05′14″W	Sugarcreek Township	Home of one of the township's first resident families
8	Brick Quarters Historic District		November 5, 2018 (#100003071)	Chidlaw Rd. and Metzger Dr. at Wright-Patterson Air Force Base; 39°48′32″N 84°02′20″W	Bath Township	
9	C.N. & I. Department Power House	C.N. & I. Department Power House	October 30, 2003 (#03001099)	Central State University campus in Wilberforce; 39°43′01″N 83°52′29″W	Xenia Township	
10	Carnegie Library (Old Wilberforce University Campus)	Carnegie Library (Old Wilberforce University Campus)	June 16, 2004 (#04000610)	1400 Brush Row Rd. in Wilberforce; 39°43′03″N 83°52′55″W	Xenia Township	
11	Cedarville Opera House	Cedarville Opera House	February 9, 1984 (#84003697)	78 N. Main St. 39°44′30″N 83°48′25″W	Cedarville	Community center and performance hall
12	Alexander Conner House	Alexander Conner House	July 28, 1987 (#87000460)	99 E. 2nd St. 39°41′02″N 83°55′42″W	Xenia	Six early buildings joined into a rowhouse
13	Dean Family Farm	Dean Family Farm	May 29, 1975 (#75001409)	5 mi (8.0 km) northwest of Jamestown off U.S. Route 35 on Ballard Rd.; also 199 S. Ballard Rd. 39°40′34″N 83°49′07″W	New Jasper Township	1820s farmstead. 199 Ballard represents a boundary increase of November 16, 1994, the Dean Family Farm Historic District.
14	Downtown Xenia Historic District	Downtown Xenia Historic District	September 10, 2014 (#14000590)	Bounded by Church, Galloway, 3rd, and Collier Sts. 39°41′08″N 83°55′45″W	Xenia	
15	East Second Street District	East Second Street District	March 20, 1973 (#73001451)	235 and 209-213-215 E. 2nd St.; also 184-271 E. 2nd St. 39°41′01″N 83°55′31″W	Xenia	Prestigious Gilded Age neighborhood. Second set of boundaries represents a boundary increase of September 10, 1979
16	Emery Hall	Emery Hall	October 4, 2005 (#05001144)	Central State University campus in Wilberforce; 39°43′03″N 83°52′58″W	Xenia Township	
17	Fairborn Theatre	Fairborn Theatre	July 27, 2005 (#05000755)	34 S. Broad St. 39°49′14″N 84°01′39″W	Fairborn	Streamline Moderne theater, built with themes relevant to the nearby military base
18	Grinnell Mill Historic District	Grinnell Mill Historic District	November 29, 1982 (#82001464)	3536 Bryan Park Rd., southeast of Yellow Springs; 39°46′59″N 83°52′28″W	Miami Township	
19	Harper Mausoleum and George W. Harper Memorial Entrance	Harper Mausoleum and George W. Harper Memorial Entrance	February 11, 1988 (#88000115)	North Cemetery along State Route 72; 39°45′15″N 83°48′44″W	Cedarville	Egyptian Revival memorial to a wealthy Cedarville resident
20	Hollencamp House	Hollencamp House	July 18, 1980 (#80003029)	339 E. 2nd St. 39°41′03″N 83°55′24″W	Xenia	Home of a leading immigrant brewer
21	Huffman Field	Huffman Field	May 6, 1971 (#71000640)	Wright-Patterson Air Force Base, 1 mi (1.6 km) southwest of Fairborn; 39°48′12″N 84°03′57″W	Bath Township	Field where the Wright brothers learned to fly
22	Jamestown Opera House	Jamestown Opera House	October 17, 2007 (#07001093)	19 N. Limestone St. 39°39′32″N 83°44′04″W	Jamestown	Community center and government building
23	Albert Krumm Apartments Historic District		March 10, 2025 (#100011496)	200-350 E. Emerson Ave, 222-456 Wallace Dr, 300-345 Williams St, 300 June Dr; 39°49′39″N 84°00′59″W	Fairborn	
24	Main Street Historic District	Main Street Historic District	May 19, 1989 (#89000431)	Roughly E. and W. Main St. from Elm to Water Sts. 39°36′33″N 84°00′28″W	Spring Valley	
25	McDonald Farm	McDonald Farm	June 14, 1996 (#96000673)	1446 Stone Rd., southeast of Xenia; 39°38′28″N 83°53′00″W	Xenia Township	Source of stone for the Washington Monument
26	Mercer Log House	Mercer Log House	October 16, 1981 (#81000433)	41 N. 1st St. 39°49′25″N 84°01′44″W	Fairborn	One of Ohio's best-preserved log cabins from the territorial period
27	Millen-Schmidt House	Millen-Schmidt House	November 7, 1976 (#76001432)	184 N. King St. 39°41′14″N 83°55′54″W	Xenia	Italianate mansion, built to be "a house that people will notice"
28	Old Chillicothe Site	Old Chillicothe Site	April 21, 1975 (#75001410)	Along U.S. Route 68 north of Xenia; 39°43′49″N 83°56′16″W	Xenia Township	
29	The Old Hotel	The Old Hotel	August 25, 1988 (#88001296)	100-101½ W. Main St. 39°36′30″N 84°00′34″W	Spring Valley	
30	Orators Mound	Orators Mound	July 15, 1974 (#74001507)	Near Yellow Spring, east of the village of Yellow Springs; 39°48′16″N 83°52′55″W	Miami Township	Indian mound in Glen Helen; named for its common use as a speaker's platform
31	Samuel N. Patterson House	Samuel N. Patterson House	June 3, 1976 (#76001433)	364 N. King St. 39°41′23″N 83°55′56″W	Xenia	1870s house; one of its neighborhood's few survivors of the 1974 tornado
32	Pollock Works	Pollock Works	February 23, 1972 (#72001014)	Along Massie's Creek, west of Cedarville; 39°44′23″N 83°49′24″W	Cedarville Township	Hopewellian ceremonial site on a hilltop
33	Whitelaw Reid House	Whitelaw Reid House	May 7, 1973 (#73001448)	Northwest of Cedarville at 2587 Conley Rd. 39°45′06″N 83°50′10″W	Cedarville Township	Home of Whitelaw Reid, journalist and politician
34	South School	South School	October 4, 1989 (#89001459)	909 S. High St. 39°47′55″N 83°53′45″W	Yellow Springs	1850s Greek Revival school; formerly Yellow Springs High School
35	Tawawa Chimney Corner		July 27, 2020 (#100005361)	1198 Brush Row Rd. 39°43′08″N 83°53′11″W	Wilberforce	
36	Waterstreet Historic District	Waterstreet Historic District	August 11, 1980 (#80003030)	Roughly bounded by Shawnee Creek and S. Detroit, S. Church and W. 2nd Sts. 39°40′58″N 83°55′54″W	Xenia	
37	Whitehall Farm	Whitehall Farm	July 31, 1980 (#80003031)	North of Yellow Springs off U.S. Route 68; 39°48′42″N 83°52′55″W	Miami Township	Greek Revival country estate
38	Benjamin Whiteman House	Benjamin Whiteman House	April 3, 1973 (#73001449)	East of Clifton; 39°47′45″N 83°49′01″W	Cedarville Township	
39	Wickersham House	Wickersham House	December 7, 2018 (#100003208)	23 E. Washington St. 39°39′29″N 83°44′00″W	Jamestown	
40	Wilberforce University Historic District		April 27, 2026 (#100012936)	1055 N. Bickett Rd. (Wilberforce University); 39°42′24″N 83°52′45″W	Wilberforce	
41	Williamson Mound State Memorial	Williamson Mound State Memorial	December 13, 1971 (#71000639)	Off U.S. Route 42, west of Cedarville; 39°44′42″N 83°49′37″W	Cedarville Township	Large Adena burial mound
42	Wright Brothers Hill-Memorial	Wright Brothers Hill-Memorial	July 19, 2016 (#16000460)	Memorial Dr. 39°47′38″N 84°05′21″W	Bath Township	
43	Wright Brothers Memorial Mound Group	Wright Brothers Memorial Mound Group	February 12, 1974 (#74001505)	A short distance west of the Wright Brothers Memorial, west of Fairborn; 39°47′41″N 84°05′27″W	Bath Township	
44	Wright-Patterson Air Force Base Mound	Wright-Patterson Air Force Base Mound	February 23, 1972 (#72001015)	Located along P St., about 1 kilometre (3,300 ft) south of the Wright Brothers Memorial, west of Fairborn; 39°47′12″N 84°05′04″W	Bath Township	Adena mound on a military base
45	Xenia Carnegie Library	Xenia Carnegie Library	February 24, 2015 (#15000041)	194 E. Church St. 39°41′16″N 83°55′35″W	Xenia	
46	Yellow Springs Historic District	Yellow Springs Historic District	April 1, 1982 (#82003573)	Roughly bounded by railroad tracks, Yellow Springs-Fairfield Rd., and High and Herman Sts. 39°48′10″N 83°53′22″W	Yellow Springs	Large historic district, primarily built during the mid-19th century
47	Col. Charles Young House	Col. Charles Young House	March 30, 1974 (#74001506)	Columbus Pike between Clifton and Stevenson Rds., east of Xenia; 39°42′26″N 83°53′25″W	Xenia Township	House museum open to visitors

== Former listings ==
	Name on the Register	Image	Date listed	Date removed	Location	City or town	Description
1	Homewood Cottage		January 18, 1973 (#73002286)	June 24, 1974	Brush Row Rd. in Wilberforce	Xenia Township	Home of Hallie Quinn Brown. Destroyed by a tornado during the April 3–4, 1974 Super Outbreak
2	William S. Scarborough House	William S. Scarborough House	January 18, 1973 (#73002291)	June 24, 1974	Brush Row Rd. in Wilberforce	Xenia Township	Home of William Sanders Scarborough. Destroyed by a tornado during the April 4, 1974 Super Outbreak

== See also ==
- List of National Historic Landmarks in Ohio
- Listings in neighboring counties: Clark, Clinton, Fayette, Madison, Miami, Montgomery, Warren
- National Register of Historic Places listings in Ohio
