= Dean Family Farm =

- U.S. National Register of Historic Places
- Location within Ohio Location within the United States
- Nearest city: Jamestown, Ohio
- Coordinates: 39°40′34″N 83°49′7″W
- Built: 1815
- Architectural style: Federal
- NRHP reference No.: 75001409 (original); 94001300 (increase)

Significant dates
- Added to NRHP: May 29, 1975
- Boundary increase: November 16, 1994

The Dean Family Farm, listed since 1975 as a historic site on the National Register of Historic Places, has its origins with the immigration of Daniel Dean, a native of Tobermore, County Londonderry, Ireland, to Philadelphia, Pennsylvania, in 1784 when he was aged 18, according to Dean family histories. Daniel was a son of George Roger Dean, who fought in the Colonial line, and Mary Campbell who was reared with her sister by the Duke of Argyl at Inveraray Scotland, the clan Campbells' ancestral home.

The National Register and an Ohio Historic Inventory, dated 11 October 1974, list the historic site at 199 N. Ballard Road, Xenia, as having five buildings dating from the 1820s on 157 acres (0.6 km^{2}) along Caesar's Creek in Greene County, Ohio. The National Register listing was expanded by a boundary increase adding 199 Ballard in 1994, and renaming as the Dean Family Farm Historic District.

Daniel Dean, born October 20, 1766, in Ireland was a son of George Roger Dean, whom DAR archival records list as a Pennsylvania sergeant and militiaman in the 1770s, along with his elder brothers James and David Dean. A weaver by trade, Daniel Dean lived briefly in Pennsylvania, Maryland and Virginia before meeting and marrying Jannet "Jenny" Steele (1768-November 18, 1841), a Scots-Irish girl of Steele's Tavern in Augusta County, Virginia. The couple relocated near Mount Sterling, Kentucky, where Dean built a mill, a house for the couple and another for his sister and mother, both named Mary, whom he brought from Ireland to Kentucky via Wilmington, North Carolina, in 1790.

Daniel and Jannet had the first of their 11 children while in Kentucky. But when Ohio became a free state in 1803, Dean, an ardent abolitionist, scouted out the new lands north of the Ohio River with his brother-in-law, Henry Barnes, a skilled builder whose son later would become Greene County's wartime sheriff and treasurer. Dean, shortly thereafter, bought 2,000 acres (8.1 km^{2}) on Caesar's Creek near the settlement of Xenia, but he spent several years litigating to perfect his title. Once his title was secure, Dean joined Barnes and their families in relocating via Fort Washington (later Cincinnati) to Greene County in September 1812. They first dined using as a table a huge, flat rock—then began a lucrative business in which Dean harvested and milled timber for lumber used by Barnes to build homes in and near Xenia, Ohio. Dean's son, Joseph (1804–83), wed Hannah Boggs (1809–88)and, according to Dean Family records, Joseph built the first substantial two-story home on the family farm in 1823, a house that still stands.

Daniel Dean, descended from Covenanter Presbyterians, was a church stalwart. At least 36 of his 111 progeny enlisted and served honorably in the Union Army during the Civil War, according to records read at an 1880 Dean family picnic. The elder Dean, who died January 24, 1843, at age 77, is buried alongside his wife, Jannet, in the Dean Family Cemetery in New Jasper Township. The cemetery and farm, privately owned, were added to the National Register of Historic Places in 1994. The historic Ballard Road Covered Bridge stands just off Route 35 nearby and spans a fork of Caesar's Creek.

Greene County (Ohio) Public Library archives feature maps, from 1855, 1874 and 1896, depicting the original Dean Family Farm acreage divided among Daniel's heirs — Joseph, William, John, Levi, D. S. Dean and others. Lands lie along the Jamestown Turnpike, now U.S. Route 35.
