= Shawnee Hills, Greene County, Ohio =

Shawnee Hills, Ohio
- Census-designated place
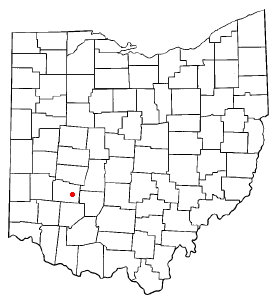
- Location of Shawnee Hills, Ohio
- Coordinates: 39°39′05″N 83°46′56″W
- Country: United States
- State: Ohio
- County: Greene
- Townships: New Jasper, Silvercreek

Area
  - Total: 2.97 sq mi (7.68 km^{2})
  - Land: 2.68 sq mi (6.94 km^{2})
  - Water: 0.29 sq mi (0.74 km^{2})
- Elevation: 1,043 ft (318 m)

Population (2020)
  - Total: 2,230
  - Density: 831.8/sq mi (321.17/km^{2})
- Time zone: UTC-5 (Eastern (EST))
  - Summer (DST): UTC-4 (EDT)
- FIPS code: 39-71983
- GNIS feature ID: 2393229

Shawnee Hills is a census-designated place (CDP) in Greene County, Ohio, United States. Shawnee Hills consists of a planned community centered on the 250-acre (1.0 km^{2}) Shawnee Lake. The population was 2,230 at the 2020 census. It is part of the Dayton Metropolitan Statistical Area, and should not be confused with the incorporated village of Shawnee Hills in Delaware County.

== Geography ==
Shawnee Hills is located in southeastern Greene County surrounding Lake Shawnee, a reservoir built on Caesar Creek, a west-flowing tributary of the Little Miami River. The community is in the eastern part of New Jasper Township and the western part of Silvercreek Township, and is bordered to the east by the village of Jamestown. Xenia, the Greene County seat, is 8 miles (13 km) to the northwest.

According to the United States Census Bureau, the Shawnee Hills CDP has a total area of 3.0 square miles (7.7 km^{2}), of which 2.7 square miles (6.9 km^{2}) is land and 0.27 square miles (0.7 km^{2}), or 9.62%, is water.

== Demographics ==
Historical population
Census	Pop.	Note	%±
2020	2,230		—
U.S. Decennial Census

As of the census of 2000, there were 2,355 people, 819 households, and 705 families residing in the CDP. The population density was 885.0 inhabitants per square mile (341.7/km^{2}). There were 859 housing units at an average density of 322.8 per square mile (124.6/km^{2}). The racial makeup of the CDP was 97.11% White, 0.89% African American, 0.64% Native American, 0.42% Asian, 0.08% from other races, and 0.85% from two or more races. Hispanic or Latino of any race were 0.68% of the population.

There were 819 households, out of which 38.9% had children under the age of 18 living with them, 74.7% were married couples living together, 7.2% had a female householder with no husband present, and 13.9% were non-families. 11.2% of all households were made up of individuals, and 3.2% had someone living alone who was 65 years of age or older. The average household size was 2.88 and the average family size was 3.09.

In the CDP the population was spread out, with 27.3% under the age of 18, 7.6% from 18 to 24, 28.6% from 25 to 44, 27.9% from 45 to 64, and 8.6% who were 65 years of age or older. The median age was 36 years. For every 100 females there were 101.1 males. For every 100 females age 18 and over, there were 96.2 males.

The median income for a household in the CDP was $55,022, and the median income for a family was $53,942. Males had a median income of $36,048 versus $28,857 for females. The per capita income for the CDP was $19,209. About 1.6% of families and 3.2% of the population were below the poverty line, including 4.0% of those under age 18 and 2.5% of those age 65 or over.
