= Lynching of Peter Betters =

1887 murder of a Black man in Jamestown, Ohio

- Location: Jamestown, Ohio, U.S.
- Date: June 12, 1887; 139 years ago
- Target: Peter Betters
- Attack type: Lynching
- Victim: Peter Betters
- Motive: Retaliation for the assault of Martha Thomas

On June 12, 1887, Peter Betters was lynched by a small mob in Jamestown, Ohio following the brutal assault of Martha Thomas. The lynching was historically notable because both assault victim Martha Thomas and the perpetrator Peter Betters was Black, and because a mixed crowd of Black and White citizens joined to seek revenge for her injuries by murdering her accused attacker Peter Betters.

== Background ==
For many years prior to her murder, Martha Thomas was a well-respected resident of Jamestown, a small community in Greene County, Ohio. In her older age, she needed increased help around her property. In early 1887, she offered fellow Jamestown resident and petty criminal Peter Betters the opportunity to work on her and her husband's land in exchange for housing. When Thomas' husband died a few months later, however, she asked Betters to move out and find other work. Betters continued to work a job with the Stinson Brothers Livery stable, despite his poor reputation in Jamestown following several recent criminal charges. Betters had recently served two sentences in Jamestown jail, one for sexual assault charges and the other for stealing a horse. Because he was known as a common thief, "it was no surprise when Betters was accused [of the assault]."

In the middle of the night on Saturday, June 11, 1887, Martha Thomas was asleep in her home when she heard a loud sound. A drunken Peter Betters had slid underneath her home and broken in by destroying the bricks of Thomas' hearth. While Martha Thomas' two visiting grandchildren were able to escape from the house, Ms. Thomas was not as lucky. When Thomas was found, she was unconscious and had suffered several broken ribs and a partially crushed skull. Despite the severity of her injuries, though, Thomas survived and was able to identify Betters as her attacker; perhaps because he was said to have attacked her with a coal oil lamp in hand.

== Lynching ==
When the Jamestown marshal found Peter Betters in the early morning of June 12, 1887, he arrested him and put him in Jamestown's lock-up. Although the small town had quickly become aware of Betters' arrest and collective anger was growing, the Jamestown marshal did not post a personal guard at Betters' cell that night. Thus, around midnight, a fifteen-person mob, made up of both Black and White Ohioans, began marching to the jail with "hats pulled over their faces and coats turned the wrong side out" as a means of disguise, and broke into Betters' cell. After forcing their way inside, mob members gave Betters to a group waiting outside who dragged him down the street toward the county fairgrounds. Onlookers were ordered to return home, but those who were able to witness the event reported that Betters repeatedly screamed out "Murder! Save me!" while the mob chanted "Hang him!" and "Shoot him!" Upon completing the half-mile walk to the fairgrounds, the mob hanged Betters from a broken oak tree. Historians David Meyers and Elise Meyers Walker write that newspaper coverage quoted organizers as saying the recently fallen tree was "forming an admirable gallows."

"The neighborhood was greatly excited over the affair and the fugitive negro was hunted down. In the fair grounds where the cyclone played such fearful havoc some time ago there are many trees bent by the storm, which make EXCELLENT GALLOWS." - page 1, Springfield News-Sun, June 13, 1887

After hanging Betters, the mob's apparent leader ordered the group to go home. Reports quoted him as addressing the group: "We have done good work; we have nothing to be sorry for. Now keep quiet and all will be well. Colored people are as true to virtue and justice as steel." The mob quickly dispersed and returned to their homes. Betters was left hanging in the fairgrounds for the rest of the early morning.

== Aftermath ==
Early the next morning, June 12, Jamestown resident Horace D. Buckles was on his way to catch a train when he passed the fairgrounds and noticed Better's body. Buckles reported, "His toes were only a couple feet from the ground." After Buckles contacted the authorities, a coroner confirmed Betters' death, and he was taken down from the tree to be quietly buried in a local cemetery. A town inquest was held shortly after Betters' death, but no one reported to have any information on the lynching. In fact, according Meyers Walker, some residents suggested Betters' death had been a suicide, although the general population did not actually believe this theory. There was no town mourning following the death of Peter Betters. Rather, Jamestown citizens were largely happy to see Thomas' assault avenged. The event passed by relatively quietly overall. A local newspaper, the Xenia Democrat News concluded, "few men could have managed a hanging bee so well or so quietly."

== Significance ==
While Better's death was of little significance to Jamestown residents, his lynching was historically notable, specifically because of its multiracial nature. In the 1890s, racial segregation was the law of the land and racial mixing was largely taboo. Nevertheless, Martha Thomas became a universally respected member of Jamestown despite her race and was known to socialize with white and Black folks alike. What is more though, and what sets this lynching apart, is that her death was avenged by a mob of both white and Black individuals who worked together to lynch Peter Betters. Segregation played no recorded role in this case. In fact, a Black man reportedly led the mob, thus acting as a superior to the white men involved. This willingness to forgo traditional racial hierarchies and societal norms about intermixing is indicative of the importance of carrying out this lynching to Jamestown residents. In that sense, this case is empirical evidence of the prevalent notion among scholars that vastly different groups can be united under the act of a riot to abandon usual societal rules and carry out a shared vision of activism or, in this scenario, justice.
