= Cedarville Township =

Cedarville Township may refer to the following places in the United States:

- Cedarville Township, Michigan
- Cedarville Township, Greene County, Ohio
