= Darrell McCall =

American singer-songwriter

- Born: April 30, 1940 (age 85); New Jasper, Ohio, U.S.
- Genres: Country, Outlaw Country
- Occupation: singer/songwriter
- Instrument: Vocals
- Years active: 1958–present
- Labels: Philips, Wayside, Atlantic, Columbia, Hillside, RCA, Indigo

Darrell McCall (born April 30, 1940) is a country music performer, known for his honky tonk and traditional country musical style at the height of his career in the 1960s, and his return to popularity during the Outlaw country era in the late 1970s.

== Early life ==
McCall was born and raised in New Jasper Township, Greene County, Ohio. He was a boyhood friend of fellow future musician Johnny Paycheck. At the age of 15, he landed a job as a disc jockey at a local Ohio radio show on Saturday mornings. During this time, he also performed as a musician at dances and other events. After graduating from high school, McCall joined the military and was stationed in Kentucky.

== Career ==
In 1958, after finishing his duty in the army, McCall moved to Nashville with Paycheck to record as a duo. The duo failed but McCall soon found work as a background singer during recording sessions for various artists including Faron Young, George Jones and Ray Price. Next, he began to tour with the bands of Young, Price and the newcomer Hank Williams Jr.

In 1959, McCall was contacted by Nashville producer Buddy Killen, and asked to join a pop band he was forming called The Little Dippers. The band released the top ten pop hit "Forever" in 1960. The next year, McCall was signed by Capitol Records as a solo singer. He released two singles for the label, but neither charted and the performer was subsequently released by Capitol. In 1962, McCall signed with Philips Records as a country music singer. He released the hit "A Stranger Was Here," which peaked at No. 17. Later in the year he performed the theme for the film Hud, which starred actor Paul Newman.

McCall decided to begin an acting career in 1965. He appeared in numerous films including Nashville Rebel, Road to Nashville and What Am I Bid. During his acting career, McCall also traveled to the American Southwest to perform in rodeos as a cowboy. In 1968, he decided to return to recording.

In 1968, McCall signed with "Wayside Records" and released four singles. In 1970, he released his first album, Meet Darrell McCall for Mercury Records. Hank Williams Jr. recorded a song penned by McCall in 1971 entitled "Eleven Roses." It became a No. 1 hit for Williams and resulted in a songwriting contract offer from "Tree International Publishing" for McCall, who accepted. In 1974, he signed with Atlantic Records, releasing the single "There's Still a Lot of Love in San Antone." The following year he left Atlantic and signed with Columbia records. During this period his popularity grew due to the Outlaw Country sound being pushed into the mainstream. With Columbia he recorded the hit duet "Lily Dale" with Willie Nelson, which became a top 40 hit and was awarded the "Best Duet of 1977" by Cash Box Magazine. After a few more singles with the label, McCall signed with Hillside Records in 1980 and released a single, but then decided to sign with RCA Records. With RCA, he released his final top 40 hit "Long Line of Empties." His final charting single "Memphis in May" was released for Indigo Records in 1984. In 1986, McCall recorded two albums, including one with Johnny Bush. Following these releases, he stopped recording but continued to tour. However, he did appear as the lead singer on a few tracks of the Ace in the Hole's 1995 debut album.

McCall continues to tour and perform on a regular basis. His wife Mona is also part of the touring band, where she contributes guitar and vocals. More recently, McCall began recording new material for Heart of Texas Records, an independent record label specializing in classic country music. He has released several albums through the label, including studio albums, a greatest hits collection and a duets record called "Survivors," with fellow classic country artists Curtis Potter and Tony Booth.

== Discography ==
=== Studio albums ===
| Year | Album | US Country | Label |
|---|---|---|---|
| 1969 | Meet Darrell McCall | 35 | Wayside |
| 1977 | Lily Dale | — | Columbia |
| 1980 | Texas Dance Hall Music | — | Hillside |
| 1986 | Hot Texas Country | — | Step One |
| 1986 | Reunion | — | BGM |
| 1992 | All She Did Was Fall in Love | — | Artap |
| 1995 | A Way to Survive | — | Artap |
| 1996 | Pictures Can't Talk Back | — | Artap |
| 2005 | Old Memories and Wine | — | Heart of Texas |
| 2008 | Lily Dale | | Heart of Texas |
| 2009 | "Keeping With Tradition" | — | Heart of Texas |
| 2010 | "The Survivors" | — | Heart of Texas |
| 2012 | Survivors II | | Heart of Texas |
| 2013 | Country From the Heart | | Heart of Texas |

=== Compilation albums ===
| Year | Album | Label |
|---|---|---|
| 1996 | Real McCall | Bear Family |
| 2006 | The Essential Darrell McCall | Heart of Texas |
| 2009 | All She Did was Fall in Love/A Way to Survive | Heart of Texas |

=== Singles ===
| Year | Single | Chart Positions | | Album |
| Year | Single | US Country | CAN Country | Album |
|---|---|---|---|---|
| 1961 | "My Kind of Lovin'" | — | — | singles only |
| 1961 | "Call the Zoo" | — | — | singles only |
| 1962 | "Dear One" | — | — | singles only |
| 1962 | "I Can Take His Baby Away" | — | — | singles only |
| 1963 | "A Stranger Was Here" (with The Milestones) | 17 | — | singles only |
| 1963 | "Hud" | — | — | singles only |
| 1964 | "Keeping My Feet on the Ground" | — | — | singles only |
| 1964 | "Step by Step" | — | — | singles only |
| 1968 | "I'd Love to Live with You Again" | 67 | — | Meet Darrell McCall |
| 1968 | "Wall of Pictures" | 60 | — | Meet Darrell McCall |
| 1969 | "Hurry Up" | 53 | — | Meet Darrell McCall |
| 1969 | "Hide and Go Cheat" | — | — | singles only |
| 1970 | "The Arms of My Weakness" | 62 | — | singles only |
| 1970 | "Sally Bryson" | — | — | singles only |
| 1972 | "Jacue Pierre Bordeaux" | — | — | singles only |
| 1972 | "I'll Break Out Again" | — | — | singles only |
| 1973 | "Rainbow at Midnight" | — | — | singles only |
| 1973 | "Goodbye of the Year" | — | — | singles only |
| 1974 | "There's Still a Lot of Love in San Antone" | 48 | — | singles only |
| 1974 | "Where Is That All" | — | — | singles only |
| 1975 | "Cold Beer Signs" | — | — | singles only |
| 1975 | "Helpless" | — | — | singles only |
| 1976 | "Pins and Needles (In My Heart)" | 52 | — | Lily Dale |
| 1976 | "I Come Home to Face the Music" | — | — | Lily Dale |
| 1977 | "Lily Dale" (with Willie Nelson) | 32 | — | Lily Dale |
| 1977 | "Dreams of a Dreamer" | 35 | — | Lily Dale |
| 1978 | "Down the Roads of Daddy's Dreams" | 59 | — | singles only |
| 1978 | "The Weeds Outlived the Roses" | 91 | 47 | singles only |
| 1979 | "Fraulein" (with Curtis Potter) | — | — | Texas Dance Hall Music |
| 1979 | "Part Time Lover Full Time Heartache" (with Curtis Potter) | — | — | Texas Dance Hall Music |
| 1980 | "San Antonio Medley" (with Curtis Potter) | 89 | — | Texas Dance Hall Music |
| 1980 | "Long Line of Empties" | 43 | 56 | singles only |
| 1984 | "Memphis in May" | 79 | — | singles only |

=== Guest singles ===
| Year | Single | Artist | Chart Positions | Album |
| Year | Single | Artist | US Country | Album |
|---|---|---|---|---|
| 1982 | "There's Still a Lot of Love in San Antone" | Connie Hanson (as "Connie Hanson & Friend") | 64 | Single only |
