= Whitehall Farm =

Historic house in Ohio, United States

- U.S. National Register of Historic Places
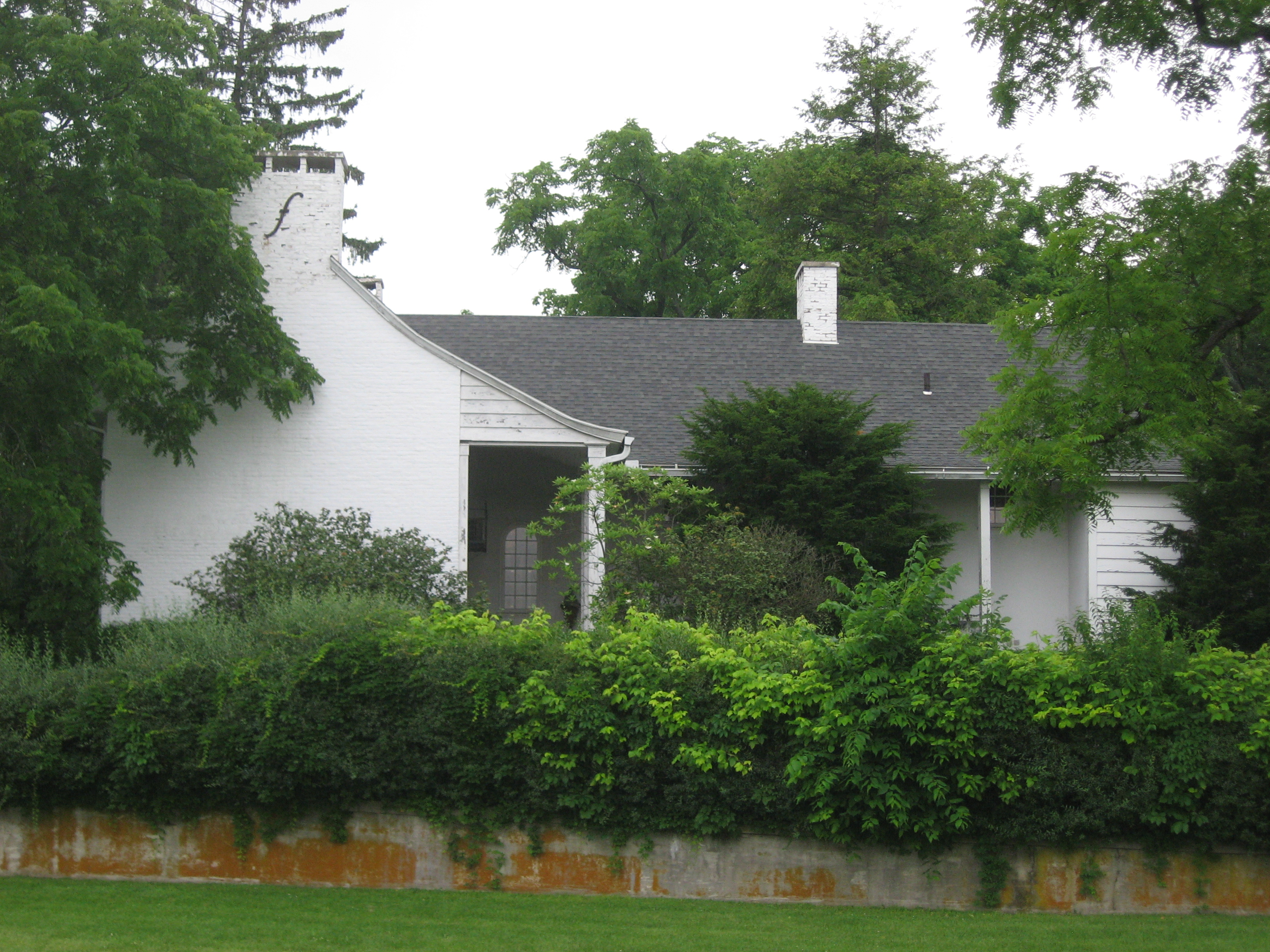
- A secondary house at Whitehall

- Location within Ohio Location within the United States
- Location: North of Yellow Springs off U.S. Route 68 in Miami Township
- Nearest city: Yellow Springs, Ohio
- Coordinates: 39°48′50″N 83°53′2″W
- Area: 0.1 acres (0.040 ha)
- Built: 1842
- Architectural style: Greek Revival
- NRHP reference No.: 80003031
- Added to NRHP: July 31, 1980

Whitehall Farm is a historic farmstead near the village of Yellow Springs in Greene County, Ohio, United States. Deemed a premier piece of architecture by the late nineteenth century, it has been named a historic site.

Land at the site of the present Whitehall Farm was purchased in 1808 by Martin Baum, one of Cincinnati's leading early citizens. By the time of his death in 1831, the estate had acquired the name of "Whitehall", and under this name it was devised to his son David Chambers Baum. After David's early death, his widow, Amanda Sroufe Baum, married Aaron Harlan, who in 1842 began planning to build a mansion on the property. The project's monumental size prompted it to be nicknamed "Harlan's Folly". Construction on Judge Harlan's mansion began in 1846 and finished in the following year. In later years, the property was acquired by E.S. Kelly, who by the 1910s had performed extensive improvements to the house and its surrounding grounds.

Two stories tall with a large four-pillar portico, Harlan's house is composed of brick walls, a stone foundation, an asbestos roof, and elements of wood and stone. Its interior is divided into twelve rooms. The brick was fired in a nearby kiln, and the ornate wooden interior was derived from standing oak and wild cherry trees in the neighborhood and the walnut trees that originally surrounded the house. Harlan chose a hillock as his construction site, and the house consequently commands a wide view in every direction. Today, the house occupies part of a large farm, which also includes another house and numerous outbuildings.

By 1918, Whitehall had acquired the status of Greene County's "most picturesque country house". Sixty-two years later, Whitehall Farm was listed on the National Register of Historic Places. While it qualified because of its important Greek Revival architecture, its place as the home of a prominent local citizen was also sufficient for its designation.
