= Ross Township, Greene County, Ohio =

Township in Ohio, US

- Township
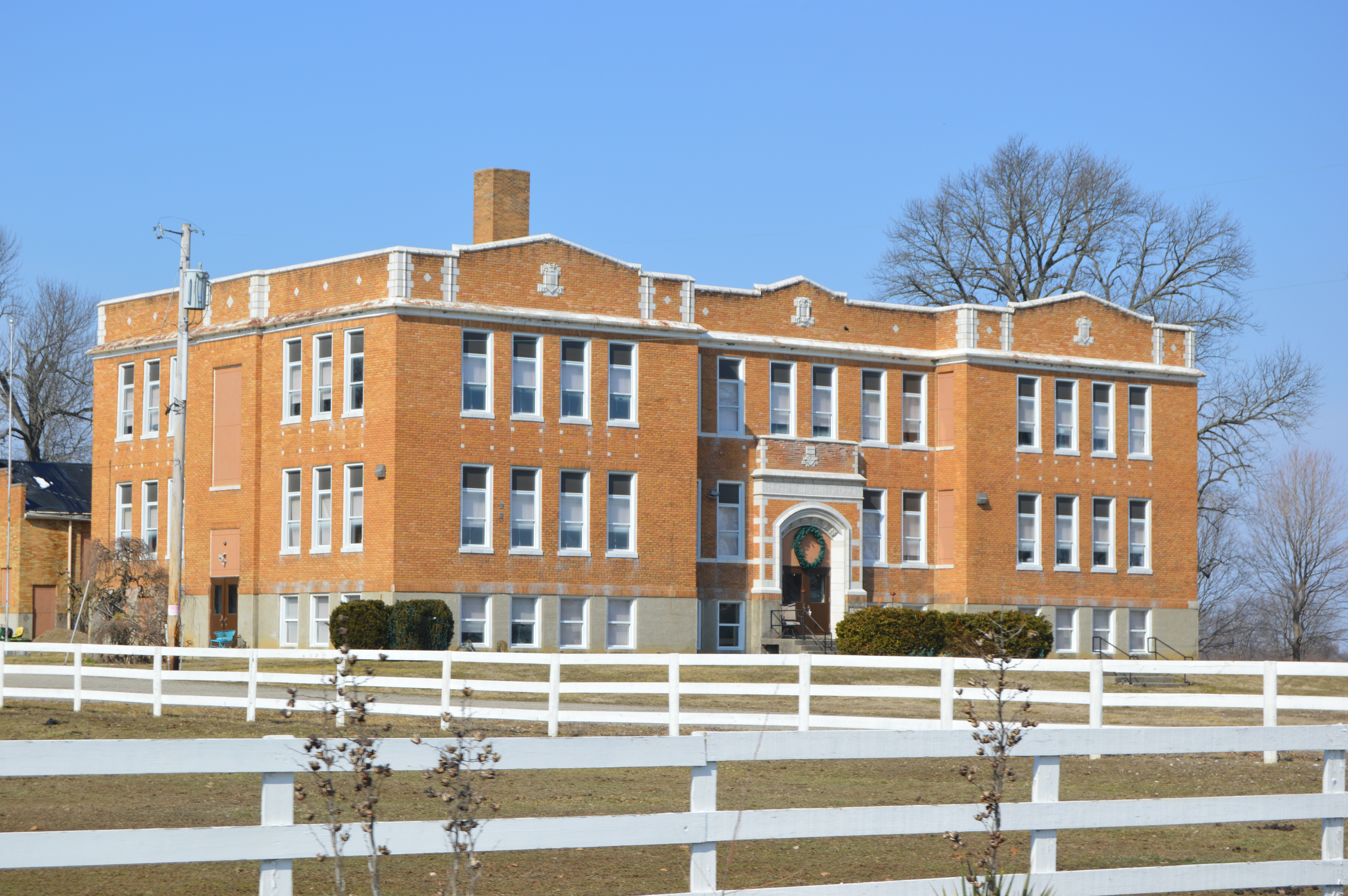
- Former township school near Grape Grove

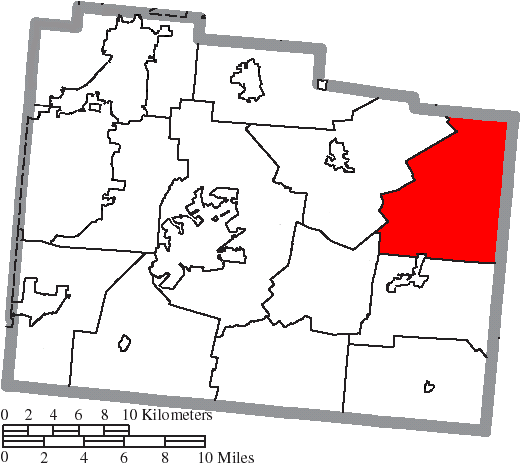
- Location of Ross Township in Greene County
- Coordinates: 39°43′20″N 83°43′23″W
- Country: United States
- State: Ohio
- County: Greene

Area
  - Total: 36.1 sq mi (93.6 km^{2})
  - Land: 36.1 sq mi (93.4 km^{2})
  - Water: 0.039 sq mi (0.1 km^{2})
- Elevation: 1,073 ft (327 m)

Population (2020)
  - Total: 818
  - Density: 22.7/sq mi (8.76/km^{2})
- Time zone: UTC-5 (Eastern (EST))
  - Summer (DST): UTC-4 (EDT)
- FIPS code: 39-68630
- GNIS feature ID: 1086171
- Website: https://www.rosstwpgreene.us/

Ross Township is one of the twelve townships of Greene County, Ohio, United States. As of the 2020 census, the population was 818.

== Geography ==
Located in the northeastern corner of the county, it borders the following townships:

- Madison Township, Clark County - north
- Stokes Township, Madison County - northeast
- Jefferson Township, Fayette County - southeast
- Silvercreek Township - south
- New Jasper Township - southwest
- Cedarville Township - west

It is the only township in the county with a border on Madison County.

An uninhabited portion of the village of Jamestown is located in southern Ross Township.

The highest point in Greene County, 1,135 feet (346 m), is located 2.2 miles (3.5 km) west of the northeastern corner of the county, in northern Ross Township.

== Name and history ==
Ross Township was established in 1811. Ross was the name of a pioneer settler.

Statewide, other Ross Townships are located in Butler and Jefferson Counties.

== Government ==
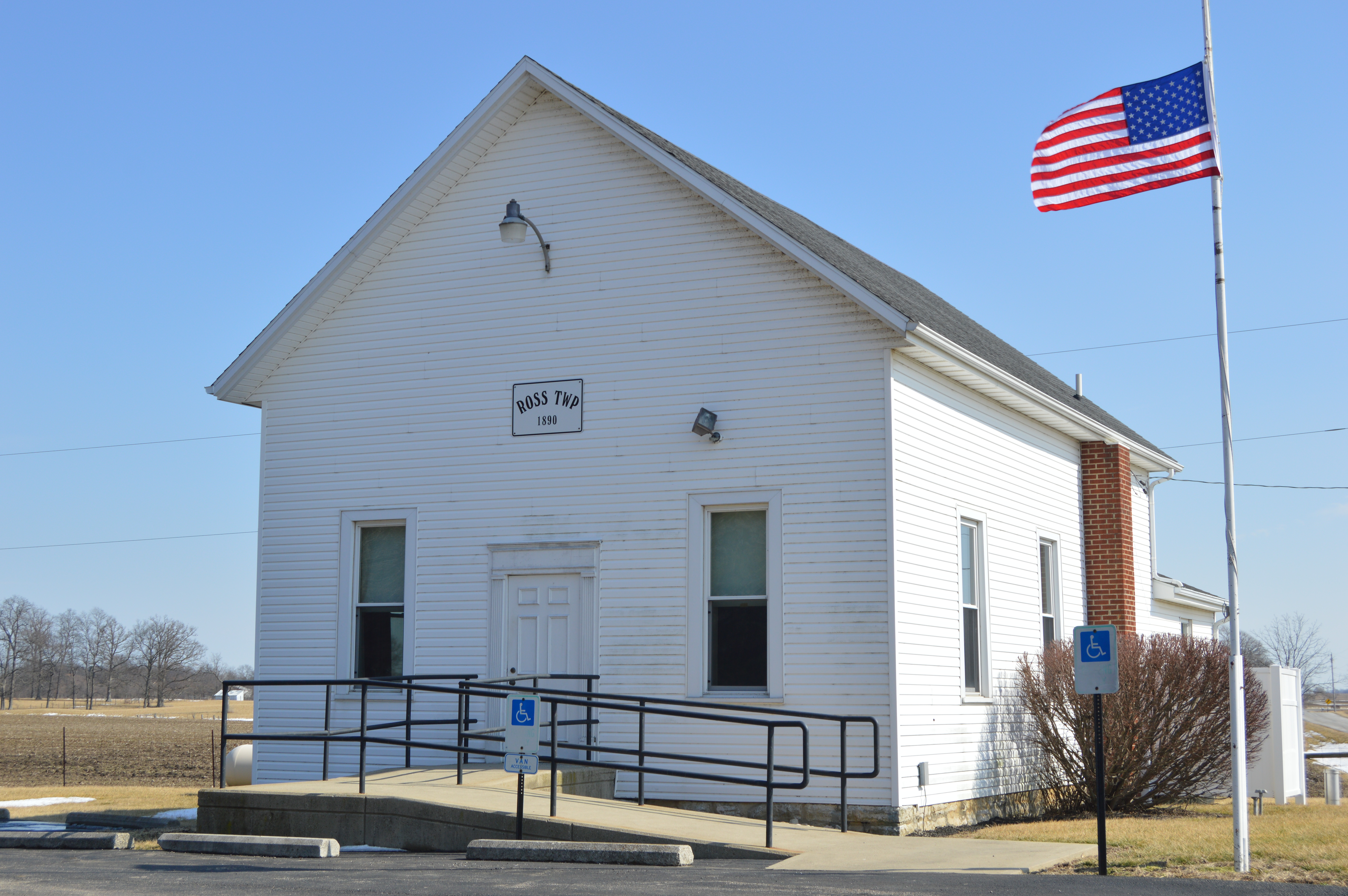
Township hall

The township is governed by a three-member board of trustees, who are elected in November of odd-numbered years to a four-year term beginning on the following January 1. Two are elected in the year after the presidential election and one is elected in the year before it. There is also an elected township fiscal officer, who serves a four-year term beginning on April 1 of the year after the election, which is held in November of the year before the presidential election. Vacancies in the fiscal officership or on the board of trustees are filled by the remaining trustees.
