= Wright-Patterson Air Force Base Mound =

Archaeological site in Ohio, United States

- U.S. National Register of Historic Places
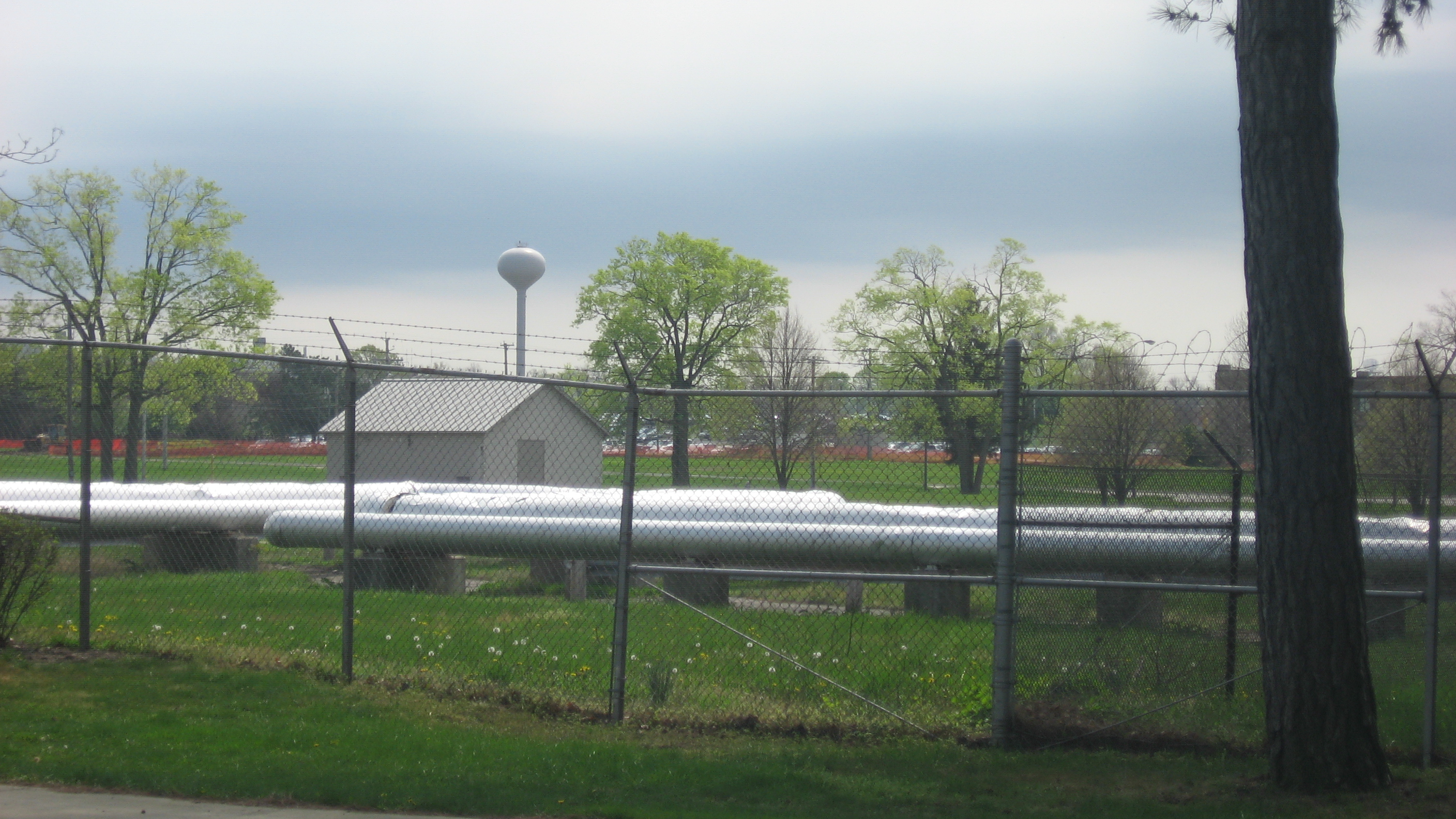
- Looking toward the mound from Huffman Prairie

- Location within Ohio Location within the United States
- Location: Located along P St., about 1 kilometre (3,300 ft) south of the Wright Brothers Memorial, west of Fairborn
- Coordinates: 39°47′12.3″N 84°5′4″W
- Area: Less than 1 acre (0.40 ha)
- NRHP reference No.: 72001015
- Added to NRHP: February 23, 1972

The Wright-Patterson Air Force Base Mound, designated 33GR31, is a Native American mound near the city of Dayton in Greene County, Ohio, United States. Named for its location on an Air Force facility, Wright-Patterson Air Force Base, the mound is an archaeological site.

The mound lies on a bluff sitting above generally flat terrain; it measures 86 feet (26 m) in diameter and slightly more than 8 feet (2.4 m) tall. Located about 0.62 miles (1.00 km) south of the memorial to the Wright brothers on Huffman Prairie, it is believed to have been built by people of the prehistoric Adena culture, who inhabited southwestern Ohio approximately between 500 BC and AD 400. Pieces of limestone are present near the mound's surface; this may indicate that the builders covered it with limestone and that natural forces such as wind have since covered the stone with the soil that now forms the mound's surface.

In 1972, the mound was listed on the National Register of Historic Places because of its archaeological importance; it was the fourth Greene County location to be added to the Register, following Huffman Prairie and the two earthworks sites at Indian Mound Reserve near Cedarville. While it has never been excavated, it was subjected to a range of geophysical survey methods in mid-1996. Hoping to discover the locations of buried bodies and to learn about the soil within the mound, the surveyors used techniques such as ground-penetrating radar and found evidence of the mound's stratigraphy, as well as revealing evidence of unidentified features in and around it. Future excavations, if conducted, are expected to increase knowledge of Adena death customs and daily life.
