= Ballard Road Covered Bridge =

- U.S. National Register of Historic Places
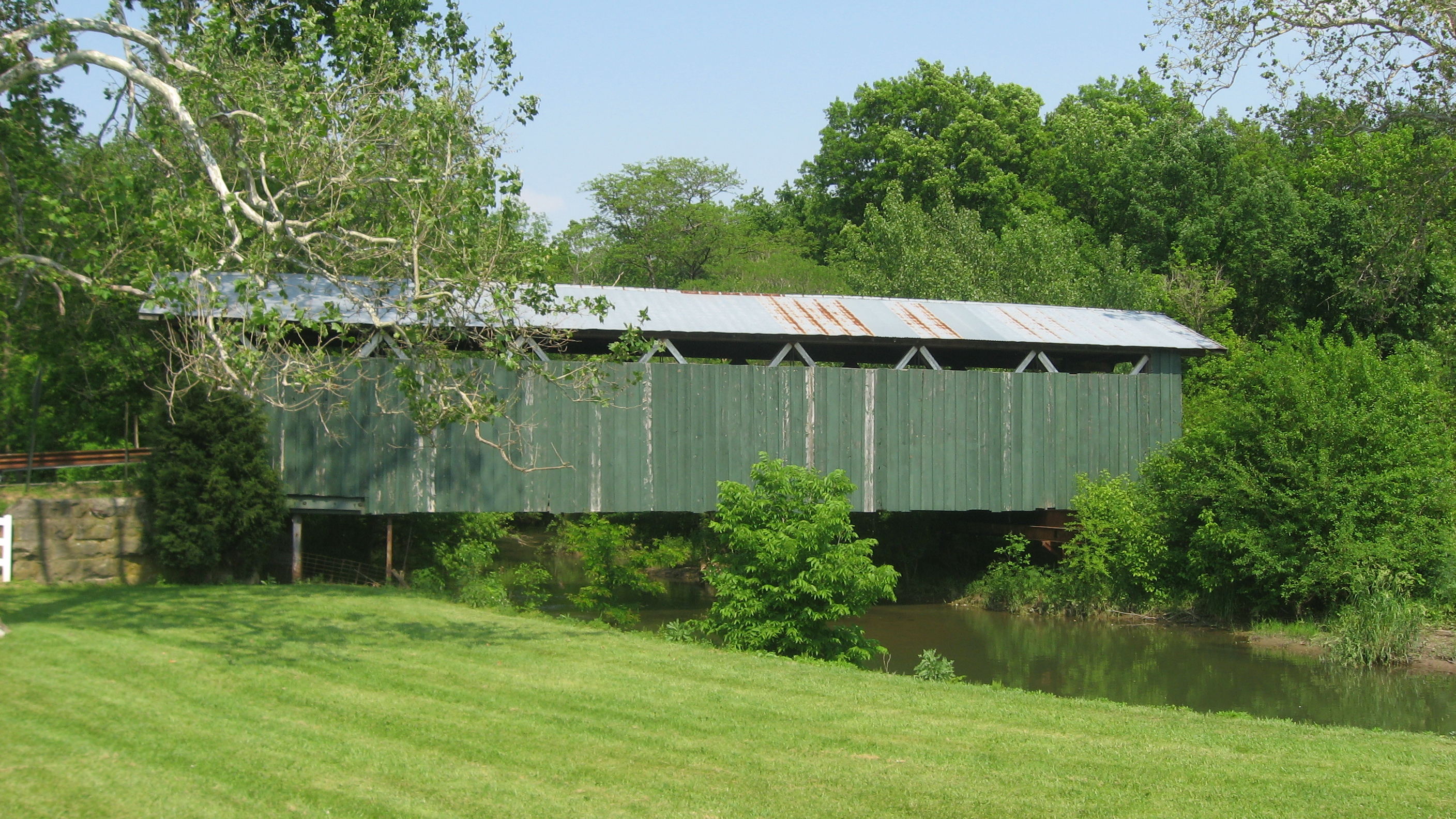
- Western (downstream) side

- Location within Ohio Location within the United States
- Location: Northwest of Jamestown on Ballard Rd. over Caesars Creek
- Nearest city: Jamestown, Ohio
- Coordinates: 39°40′41″N 83°48′55″W
- Area: Less than 1 acre (0.40 ha)
- Built: 1883
- Architect: H.E. Hebble
- Architectural style: Howe Truss
- NRHP reference No.: 75001408
- Added to NRHP: May 29, 1975

The Ballard Road Covered Bridge is a historic wooden covered bridge in the southwestern part of the U.S. state of Ohio. Built in the late nineteenth century and since bypassed, the bridge has been named a historic site.

Following a design by H.E. Hebble, James E. Brown built the bridge across Caesar's Creek in 1883. He chose to name it for a nearby industrialist, Lyman Ballard, who had constructed a water-powered mill on the creek to grind grain approximately thirty years before. Brown chose a seven-panel Howe truss design for the bridge, which measures 80 feet (24 m) in length. Built of wood with iron elements on abutments of limestone and covered with a metal roof, the single-span bridge is covered with vertical siding and retains the original square shape of its portals. Much of Greene County is underlain by high-quality limestone (the McDonald Farm near Xenia supplied limestone for the Washington Monument) and from this limestone the bridge's abutments were taken; it appears that the quarries for the abutments were located elsewhere in the surrounding New Jasper Township.

Although the Ballard Road Bridge remains in its original rural setting, its surroundings are no longer as quiet as originally; U.S. Route 35 has been constructed as a controlled-access highway immediately to the south, and Ballard Road now dead-ends at the bridge. By the 1970s, it was one of just eighteen Howe truss covered bridges remaining in Ohio, although thousands of bridges were built to this design in the 19th century throughout the United States. As such, it was deemed historically significant enough to qualify to be added to the National Register of Historic Places in 1975. The Ballard Road Bridge is one of five covered bridges in Greene County, and the only one open to road traffic.
