= Jamestown Opera House =

- U.S. National Register of Historic Places
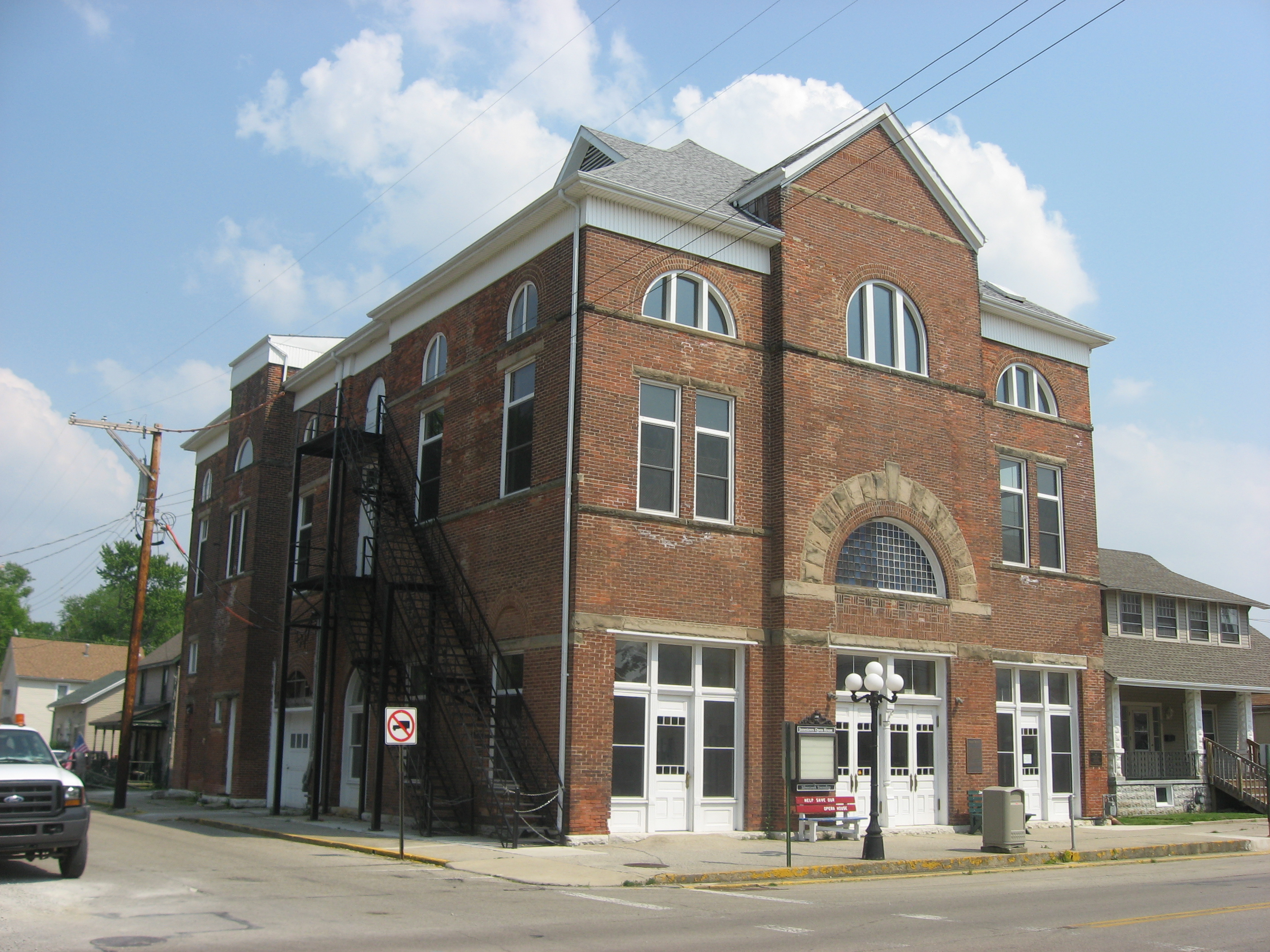
- Front and northern side

- Location within Ohio Location within the United States
- Location: 19 N. Limestone St., Jamestown, Ohio
- Coordinates: 39°39′32″N 83°44′4″W
- Area: 0.2 acres (0.081 ha)
- Built: 1889
- Architect: John W. McLean; Matthew Moorman & Sons
- Architectural style: Romanesque Revival
- NRHP reference No.: 07001093
- Added to NRHP: October 17, 2007

The Jamestown Opera House is a historic government building and community center in the village of Jamestown, Ohio, United States. It has been named a historic site because of its well-preserved architecture. Besides serving as a theater, the opera house has functioned as the community's village hall, its fire station, its post office, and its library.

== Historic context ==
Established on 16 September 1823, Jamestown's first post office was conducted in conjunction with the postmaster's store. For many years, the location of the post office was the subject of a community dispute; each postmaster moved it away from the location used by the previous postmaster, and one postmaster moved its location weekly, prompting comparisons to circuit-riding Methodist preachers. A library was functioning in the community by 1870, although its use was restricted to students in the village schools. When the community was platted, its main intersection was that of Limestone and Xenia Streets: Limestone was the north-south road connecting Urbana, Ohio with Maysville, Kentucky, while Xenia was the east-west road from Xenia to Washington Court House. In Jamestown's early years, the southeastern corner of the intersection was occupied by a tavern that had been replaced with a store by the early 1880s. On this corner of the intersection, the Opera House was built in 1889. It was not originally built as a post office, but the office was moved to the Opera House after the size of the previous post office was discovered to be insufficient for Rural Free Delivery regulations. It operated in this role until a purpose-built post office was constructed in 1902.

== Architecture ==
The Opera House is a Romanesque Revival structure designed by John W. McLean and the firm of Matthew Moorman. Its brick walls rest on a foundation of limestone and are covered with a combination shingle-and-fiberglass roof. When it was built, the ordinance for its construction provided that it be used only for government offices, causing problems when it began to be used for postal purposes. Besides the offices for Jamestown's village government and for the officials of Silvercreek Township, the opera house was built with a substantial auditorium with a stage, as well as storage for stage equipment. It remained in its designed uses for less than half a century.

== Restoration ==
In 2007, the Jamestown Opera House was listed on the National Register of Historic Places, qualifying both because of its historically significant architecture and because of its place in local history. At the time, it was a work in progress, rather than being actively used for a specific purpose. It's one of two Greene County opera houses on the Register, along with the Cedarville Opera House in Cedarville. Using more approximately $225,000 supplied by the state government in the late 2000's in two separate grants, workers installed new windows, improved the electrical and HVAC systems, and restored the exterior walls. Another grant of $50,000 was used to repaint and restore the auditorium. The renovation project concluded in 2010.
