= Indian Mound Reserve =

Archaeological site in Ohio, United States

- Williamson Mound State Memorial; Pollock Works
- U.S. National Register of Historic Places
- Location within Ohio Location within the United States
- Location: Indian Mound Reserve, 2750 U.S. Route 42
- Nearest city: Cedarville, Ohio
- Coordinates: 39°44′23″N 83°49′24″W
- Area: 1.7 acres (0.69 ha) (W); 8 acres (3.2 ha) (P)
- NRHP reference No.: 71000639 (W); 72001014 (P)
- Added to NRHP: December 13, 1971 (W); February 23, 1972 (P)

Indian Mound Reserve is a public country park near the village of Cedarville, Ohio, United States. Named for two different earthworks within its bounds — the Williamson Mound and the Pollock Works — the park straddles Massies Creek as it flows through a small canyon.

== Park ==
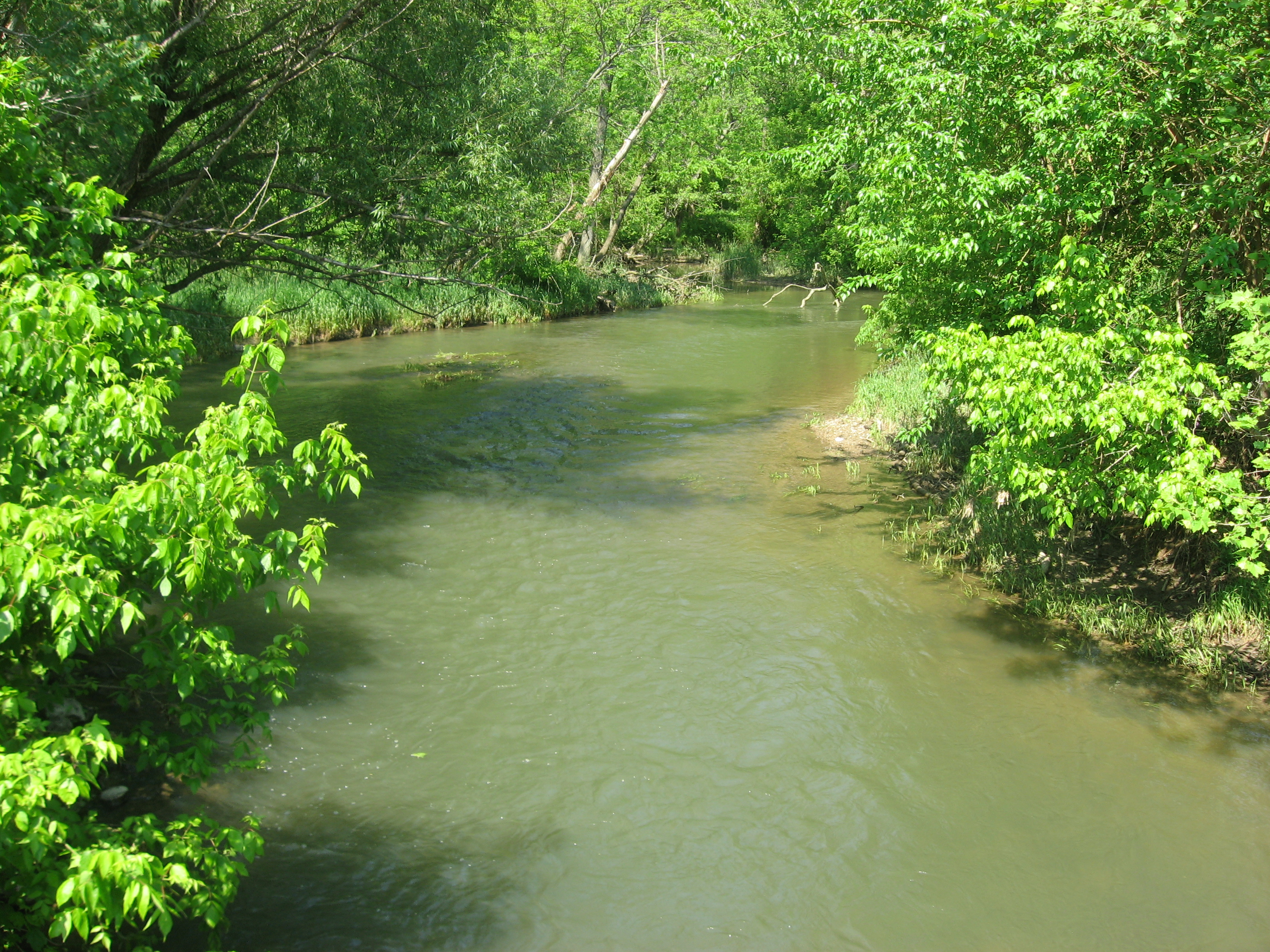
Massies Creek as it leaves the gorge

Both forks of Massies Creek flow through Cedarville Township from the east to their confluence in the township's center, whence the creek flows westward toward the Little Miami River. For the first 2 miles (3.2 km) below the confluence of the forks, the creek utilizes a shallow but sheer canyon that reaches as deep as 40 feet (12 m) below the surface of the surrounding terrain. Nathaniel Massie is reputed to have battled a Shawnee band under Tecumseh and forced them over the stream at the canyon. By the early twentieth century, local residents had known the vicinity of the "Cliffs" as a picnicking ground for the past hundred years, and calls were being made for its conversion into a park. In 1929, owners D.S. Williamson and a Xenia bank donated the Williamson Mound to the Ohio Historical Society. Today, Indian Mound Reserve is operated as a unit of the Greene County Parks, which uses it to host events such as children's camps. Hiking trails, picnic grounds, a log cabin, Cedar Cliff Falls, and the ancient earthworks are among the attractions within the park, which lies along U.S. Route 42. The earthworks are located on opposite sides of the creek: the Pollock Works on the southern side, and the Williamson Mound approximately 100 rods (1650 feet, or 500 meters) away on the northern side.

== Williamson Mound ==
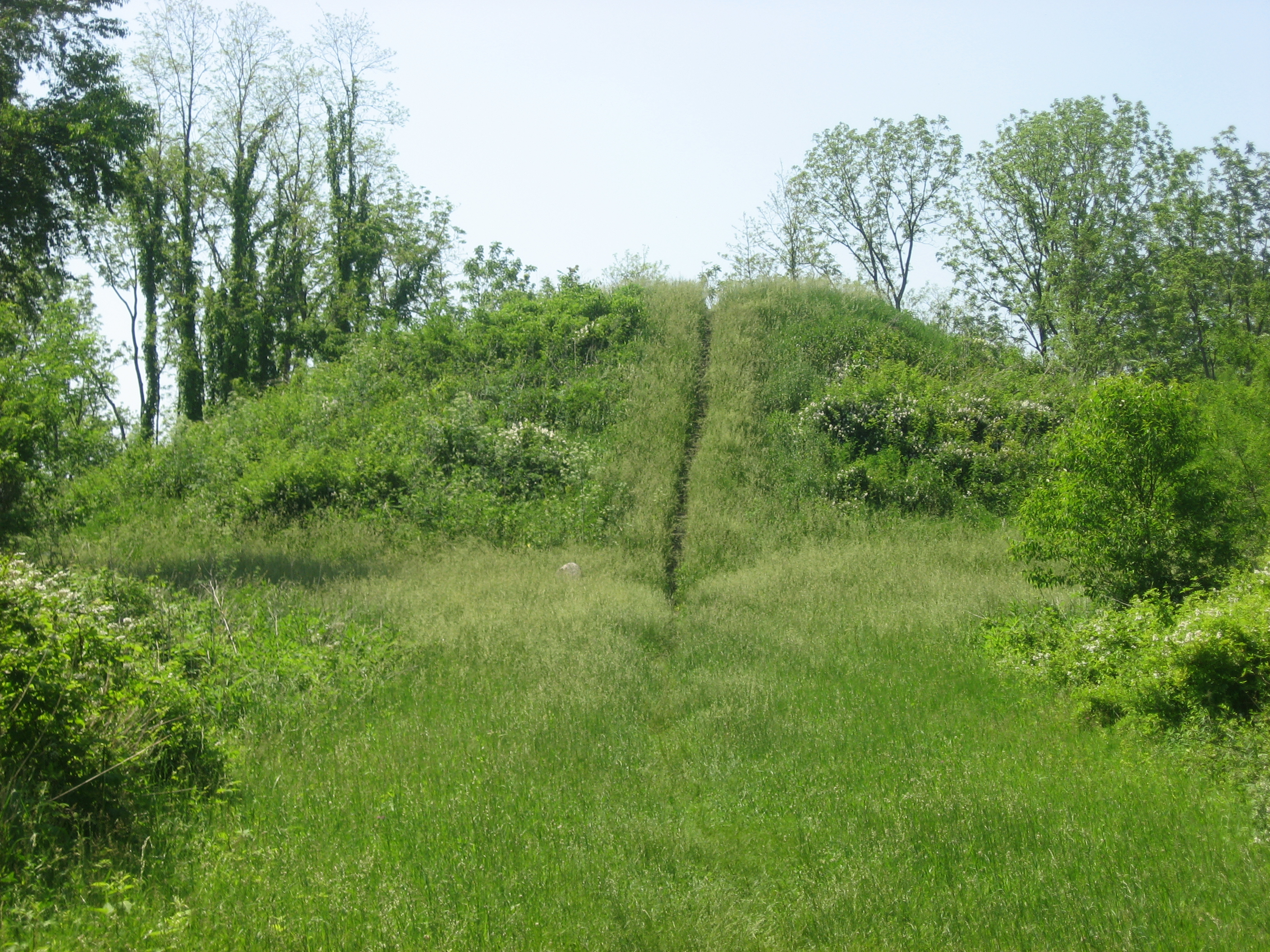
Williamson Mound from the south

The Williamson Mound is a large mound in a field near Massies Creek. In 1881, it was described as being "about forty feet high and one hundred and fifty [twelve and forty-two meters] in circumference. It is perfectly oval in form, and has on its surface trees of a century's growth, denoting that the mound is very old. From its summit can be seen a distance of several miles in every direction." Its construction was attributed to the mysterious Mound Builders of old, who surely constructed it as a watchtower from which to observe enemies from afar.

Local residents are believed to have dug around the mound around the turn of the twentieth century, but little damage appears to have been done. In the early 1970s, its dimensions were reported as being 150 feet (46 m) in diameter by 27.5 feet (8.4 m) in height; its decrease in height may have been the result of differing measurements, as in 1848, the Greene County surveyor had reported its measurements as 30 by 140 feet (9.1 m × 42.7 m). More recent archaeological studies of the site have concluded that it was constructed as a burial mound by people of the Adena culture in the final centuries before Christ. While the mound has never been scientifically excavated, its great size suggests that its construction took place over an extended period of time, leading archaeologists to conclude that it may contain evidence of multiple stages of Adena society as well as in the mortuary traditions practiced on those buried in the mound.

== Pollock Works ==
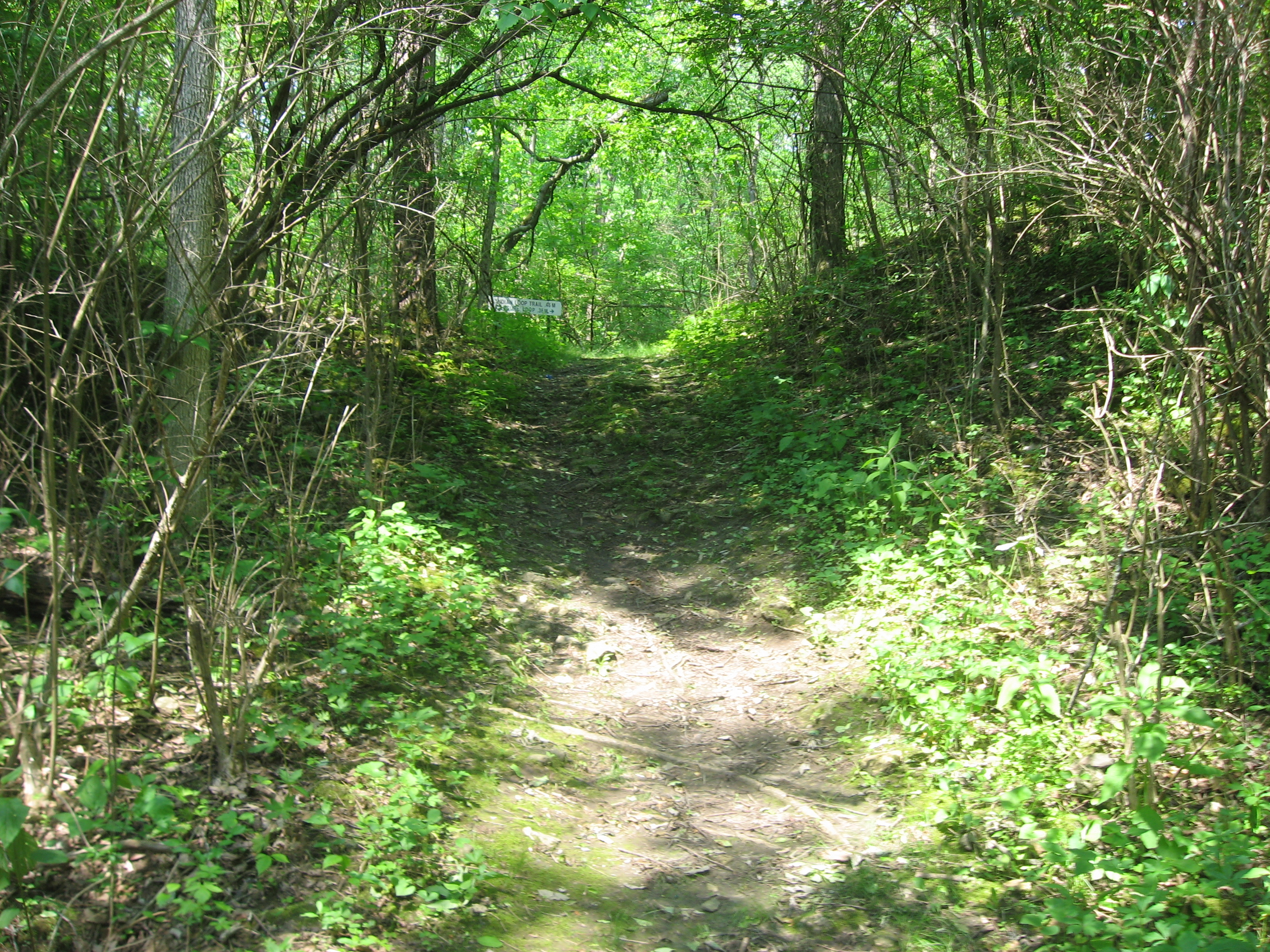
One of the gateways to the Pollock Works

The Pollock Works occupy a high promontory above the southern side of Massies Creek: both the northern and southern sides are the steep limestone walls, here averaging 25 feet (7.6 m) in height, from which the name of "Cliffs" was derived. Although occasional fissures pierce the cliff, permitting access through the old creek channel on the promontory's southern side, only via an isthmus on the western side is the promontory easily accessible, due to its gentle slope. The area of the promontory is approximately 12 acres (4.9 ha). Across the isthmus are the remnants of small crescent-shaped earthworks and an artificial wall, which in the 1840s measured 30 feet (9.1 m) thick at the base and 10 feet (3.0 m) high; it is pierced by three small gateways, at each of which was originally located a stone mound. Due to its comparatively inaccessible location, Squier and Davis proposed in their Ancient Monuments of the Mississippi Valley that the site was a fortification at which a simple palisade could render the promontory impregnable.

The works were discovered soon after Greene County was settled in the early nineteenth century and first made known to outsiders by Squier and Davis. In the 1910s, they were believed to have been the work of the Fort Ancient people, who were "totally different from the higher culture [Hopewell] of the Scioto valley", and who would in times of danger retreat to the isolated Fort Ancient site. It was one of eighty-four archaeological sites observed in 1914 by William C. Mills' countywide archaeological survey, which deemed the Pollock Works the county's premier site. Scientific excavations under a Wright State University archaeologist have demonstrated that the Pollock Works were built by the Hopewell in a five-stage process that started in the first century after Christ. It appears that Squier and Davis correctly ascertained the defensive capabilities of the site; at some point in its history, a palisade stretched across the isthmus, although it was destroyed by fire and later buried by a fresh layer of earth. Although the site was seemingly employed as a hill fort for part of its history, it appears to have been a religious location and one of numerous Hopewell hilltop ceremonial sites.

== Preservation ==
Indian Mound Reserve is actively managed by the Greene County Parks, which promotes the beauty of the creek canyon and the history of the earthworks. The archaeological importance of the reserve forms the basis for programs educating elementary-school children about archaeology. Williamson Mound was listed on the National Register of Historic Places in December 1971 — becoming Greene County's first site on the Register aside from Huffman Prairie, where the Wright brothers learned to fly — and the Pollock Works followed two months later.
