= Silvercreek Township, Greene County, Ohio =

Township in Ohio, US

- Township
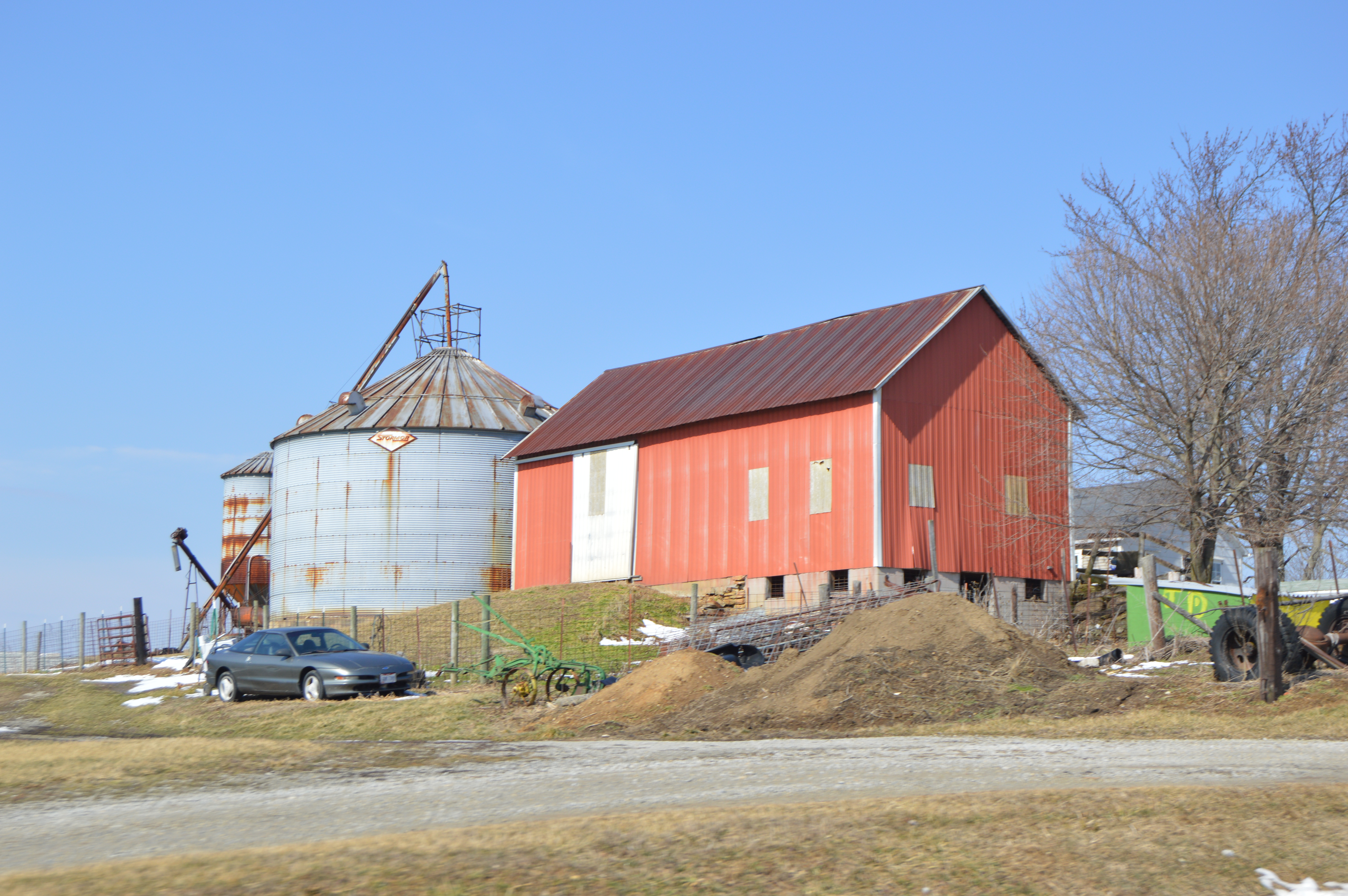
- A farmstead on Heifner Road, southeast of Jamestown

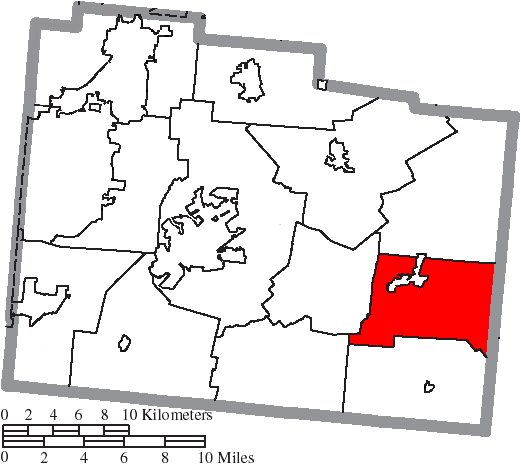
- Location of Silvercreek Township in Greene County
- Coordinates: 39°39′11″N 83°44′3″W
- Country: United States
- State: Ohio
- County: Greene

Area
  - Total: 26.4 sq mi (68.5 km^{2})
  - Land: 26.3 sq mi (68.1 km^{2})
  - Water: 0.15 sq mi (0.4 km^{2})
- Elevation: 1,060 ft (323 m)

Population (2020)
  - Total: 3,732
  - Density: 142/sq mi (54.8/km^{2})
- Time zone: UTC-5 (Eastern (EST))
  - Summer (DST): UTC-4 (EDT)
- ZIP code: 45335
- Area codes: 326 and 937
- FIPS code: 39-72473
- GNIS feature ID: 1086172

Silvercreek Township is one of the twelve townships of Greene County, Ohio, United States. As of the 2020 census, the population was 3,732.

== Geography ==
Located in the eastern part of the county, it borders the following townships:

- Ross Township - north
- Jefferson Township, Fayette County - east
- Jasper Township, Fayette County - southeast
- Jefferson Township - south
- Caesarscreek Township - southwest
- New Jasper Township - west

Most of the village of Jamestown is located in northwestern Silvercreek Township, and part of the census-designated place of Shawnee Hills is located in the township's west.

== Name and history ==
Silvercreek Township was established in 1811.

It is the only Silvercreek Township statewide.

== Government ==
The township is governed by a three-member board of trustees, who are elected in November of odd-numbered years to a four-year term beginning on the following January 1. Two are elected in the year after the presidential election and one is elected in the year before it. There is also an elected township fiscal officer, who serves a four-year term beginning on April 1 of the year after the election, which is held in November of the year before the presidential election. Vacancies in the fiscal officership or on the board of trustees are filled by the remaining trustees.
