= Harper Mausoleum and George W. Harper Memorial Entrance =

Historic site in Green County, Ohio

- U.S. National Register of Historic Places
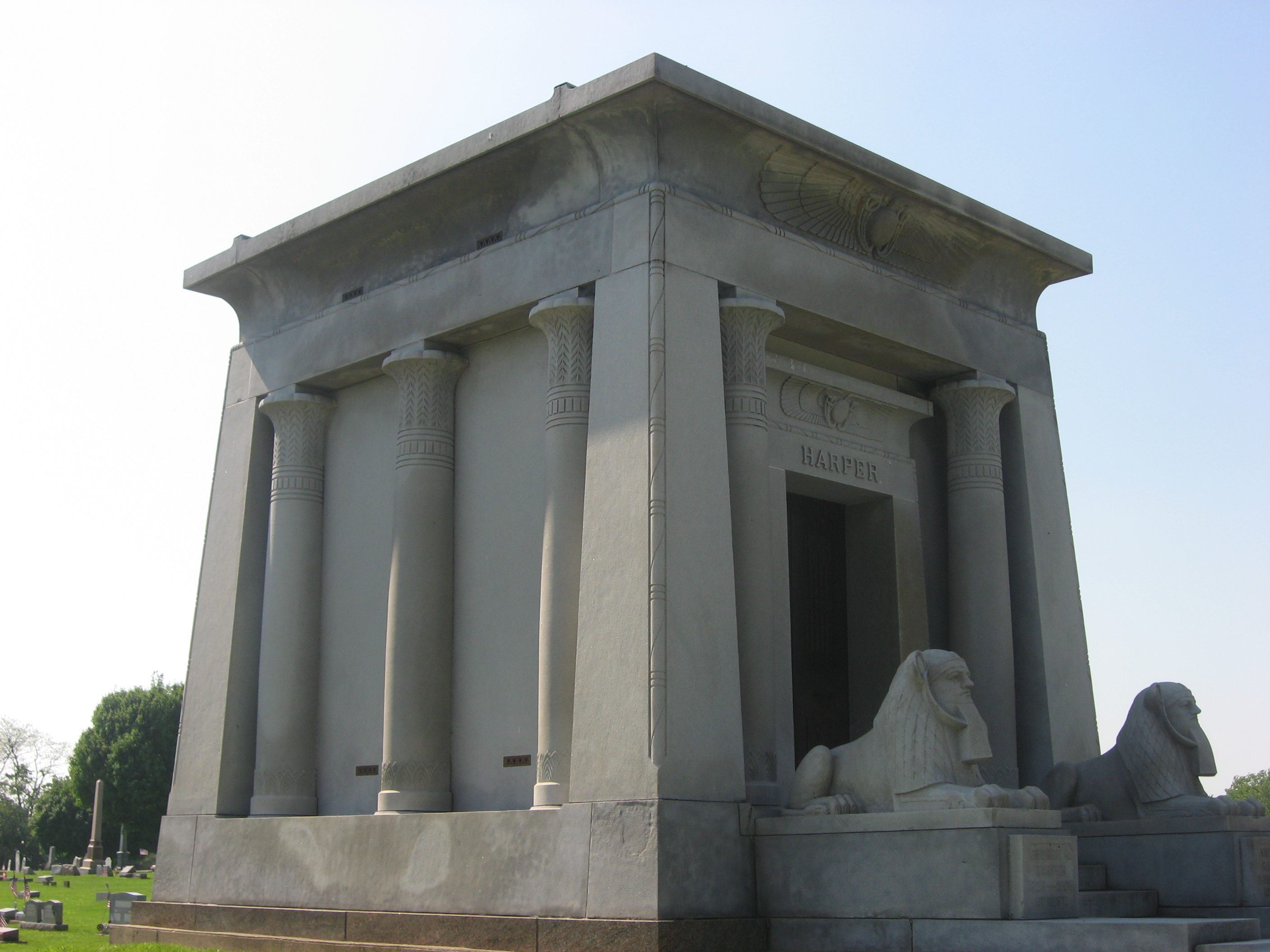
- Front and southern side of the mausoleum

- Location within Ohio Location within the United States
- Location: North Cemetery, State Route 72, Cedarville, Ohio
- Coordinates: 39°45′16″N 83°48′41″W
- Area: Less than 1 acre (0.40 ha)
- Built: 1915
- Architect: George Dodd & Sons Granite Co. Inc
- Architectural style: Egyptian Revival
- NRHP reference No.: 88000115
- Added to NRHP: February 11, 1988

The Harper Mausoleum and George W. Harper Memorial Entrance are a pair of funerary structures in the village cemetery at Cedarville, Ohio, United States. Commemorating one of Cedarville's wealthiest nineteenth-century citizens, they have together been named a historic site because of their distinctive Egyptian-style design.

== George W. Harper ==
George W. Harper was born in 1825 into a family who had emigrated from Harper's Ferry, Virginia, in 1812. Upon reaching the age of eighteen, after attending the common schools, Harper entered into business dealing cattle in Illinois and became wealthy. Having married in 1860, he and his wife joined the ranks of Greene County's largest landowners; by 1881, their estate comprised approximately 1,100 acres (450 ha), and they resided in Cedarville's finest dwelling. Harper also owned a bank in Cedarville, the George W. Harper Banking Company, which operated until being bought out by the Exchange Bank in 1896. The Harpers became educational benefactors: soon after Cedarville College was founded by the New Light Reformed Presbyterian Church circa 1900, the Harpers donated $5,000 to the college to endow a chair in economics.

== Mausoleum and cemetery entrance ==
Harper is commemorated post mortem by two structures in the Cedarville cemetery. Built in 1915, the entrance gateway to the cemetery and a family mausoleum in this rural cemetery are significant examples of Egyptian Revival architecture; some of their motifs evoke ancient Egyptian concepts of the afterlife, including two sphinxes. Built of granite on stone foundations, The two are connected by the cemetery's main drive, which extends from the entrance at the gateway to a circular drive surrounding the knoll upon which the mausoleum is located. Harper's mausoleum includes structural elements such as columns whose capitals feature palm leaves, a cornice with a design of a vulture and sun disk, and lotus flowers are depicted on the double bronze doors to the mausoleum. The gateway consists of granite posts supporting cast iron gates and topped with large granite spheres.

== Protection ==
In 1988, the Harper Mausoleum and Memorial Entrance were listed together on the National Register of Historic Places. Although cemetery properties are typically not eligible for inclusion on the National Register, exceptions can be made for distinctively designed cemetery components, and the Harper structures were deemed to be important examples of early 20th-century mortuary architecture, and additional significance arises from their place at the heart and at the entrance to the cemetery: they produce a sense of place in cemetery visitors. The properties are one of two Cedarville locations on the National Register, along with the village opera house on Main Street downtown.
