= Cedarville Opera House =

- U.S. National Register of Historic Places
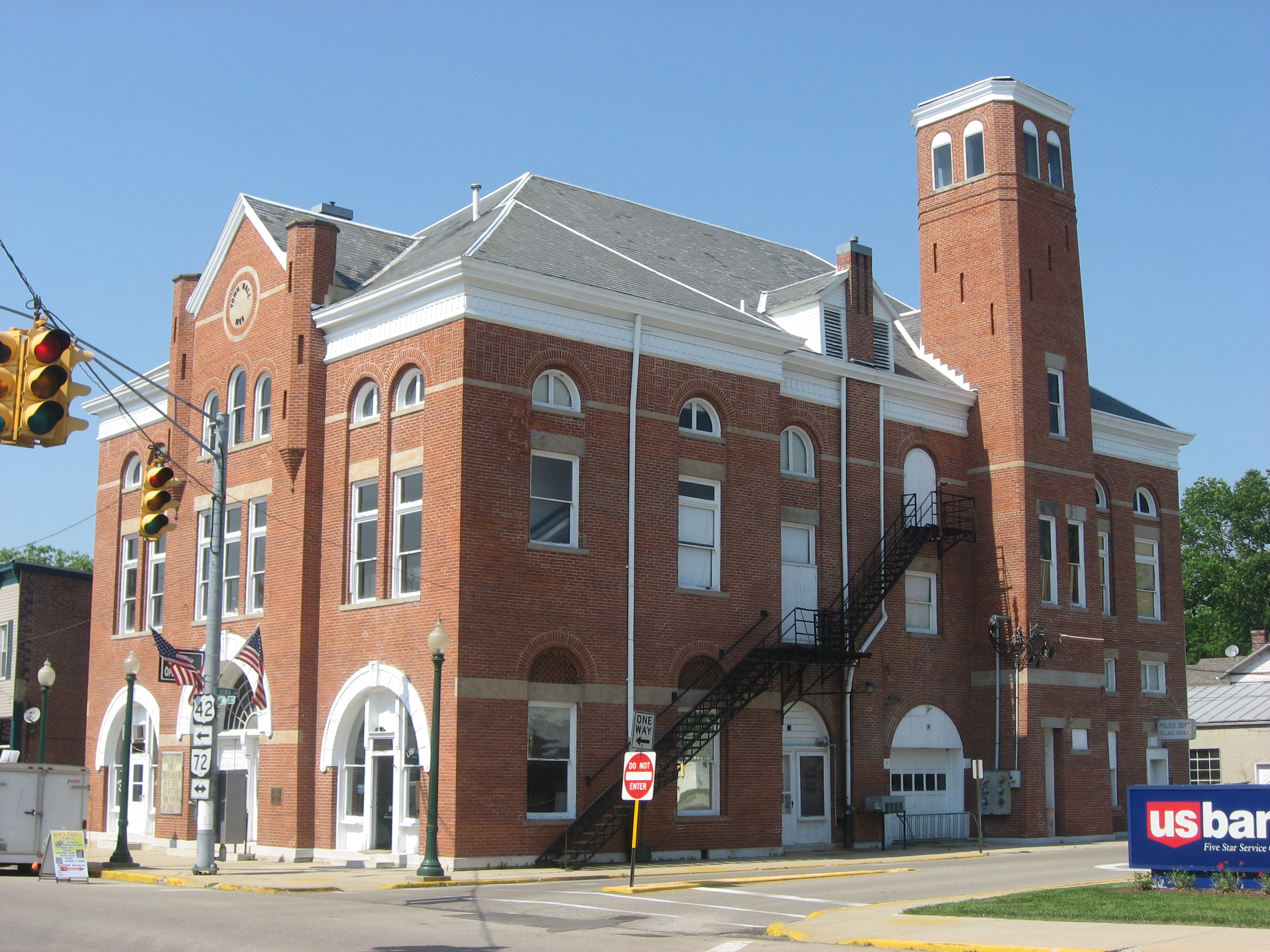
- Front and southern side of the opera house

- Location within Ohio Location within the United States
- Location: 78 N. Main St., Cedarville, Ohio
- Coordinates: 39°44′30″N 83°48′25″W
- Area: Less than 1 acre (0.40 ha)
- Built: 1888
- Architectural style: Romanesque Revival
- NRHP reference No.: 84003697
- Added to NRHP: February 9, 1984

The Cedarville Opera House is a historic theater in the village of Cedarville, Ohio, United States. Erected in 1888 on Main Street in downtown Cedarville, it has been a premier part of community life since its construction.

Built of brick with elements of stone, the opera house is a Romanesque Revival structure that has served a wide range of purposes in the community. Besides its primary function as a home for the performing arts, the two-and-a-half-story building has housed the offices of Cedarville's mayor and village council, its jail, its fire and police departments, its waterworks, as well as the township trustees' office for Cedarville Township. When Cedarville's was built, the opera house as an institution was a center of social life in rural Ohio: the public sphere was nearly nonexistent except for the village opera house, which typically served as a meeting place for travelling vaudeville acts, political events, musical performances, and graduation ceremonies. Because the first floor has always been used as offices for the various organizations that used the building, public events were typically held on the second floor, which has been little modified by the years; it is one of Ohio's least changed historic performance halls.

In 1984, the Cedarville Opera House was listed on the National Register of Historic Places, qualifying both because of its historically significant architecture and because of its place in local history. It is one of two National Register-listed properties in Cedarville and one of two National Register-listed opera houses in Greene County, along with the Harper Mausoleum and George W. Harper Memorial Entrance and the Jamestown Opera House respectively.
