= New Jasper, Ohio =

Unincorporated community in Ohio, U.S.

Coordinates: 39°39′15″N 83°49′10″W

New Jasper is an unincorporated community in New Jasper Township, Greene County, Ohio, United States.

== History ==
A post office called New Jasper was established in 1847, and remained in operation until 1905. New Jasper moved to its present location in the 1870s when the railroad was extended to that point.
