= Xenia Township, Greene County, Ohio =

Township in Ohio, US

- Township
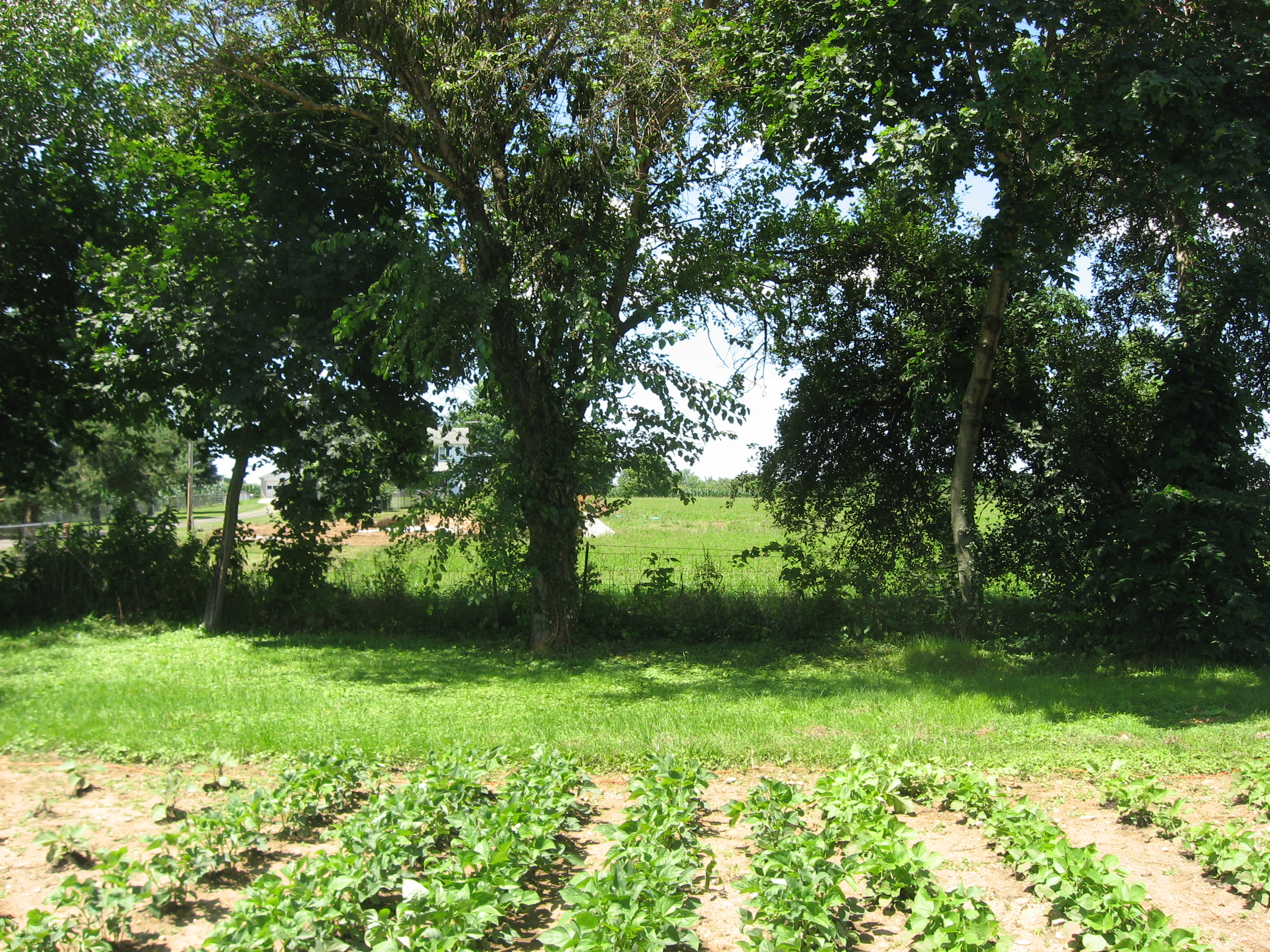
- Site of the Shawnee village of Old Chillicothe, located at the present community of Oldtown

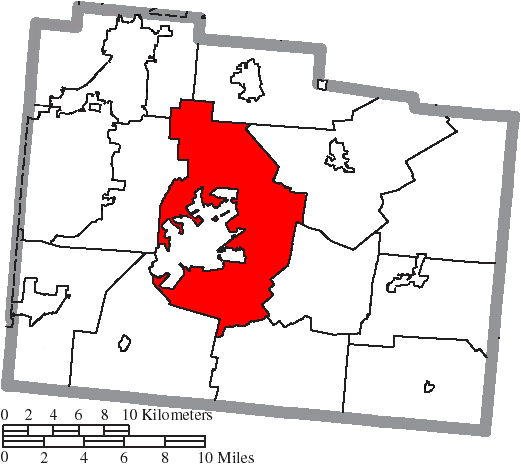
- Location of Xenia Township in Greene County
- Coordinates: 39°42′45″N 83°54′50″W
- Country: United States
- State: Ohio
- County: Greene

Area
  - Total: 43.9 sq mi (113.8 km^{2})
  - Land: 43.6 sq mi (113.0 km^{2})
  - Water: 0.27 sq mi (0.7 km^{2})
- Elevation: 928 ft (283 m)

Population (2020)
  - Total: 6,742
  - Density: 154.5/sq mi (59.66/km^{2})
- Time zone: UTC-5 (Eastern (EST))
  - Summer (DST): UTC-4 (EDT)
- ZIP code: 45385
- Area codes: 937, 326
- FIPS code: 39-86786
- GNIS feature ID: 1086176
- Website: www.xeniatownship.org

Xenia Township (/ˈziːniə/ ZEE-nee-ə) is one of the twelve townships of Greene County, Ohio, United States. As of the 2020 census, the population was 6,742.

== Geography ==
Located at the center of the county, it borders the following townships:

- Miami Township - north
- Cedarville Township - northeast
- New Jasper Township - east
- Caesarscreek Township - southeast
- Spring Valley Township - southwest
- Beavercreek Township - west
- Bath Township - northwest

The city of Xenia, the county seat of Greene County, occupies much of Xenia Township, part of the city of Fairborn is in the northwest, and the census-designated place of Wilberforce is located in the township's northeast.

== Name and history ==
Xenia Township was established in 1805.

It is the only Xenia Township statewide.

== Government ==
The township is governed by a three-member board of trustees, who are elected in November of odd-numbered years to a four-year term beginning on the following January 1. Two are elected in the year after the presidential election and one is elected in the year before it. There is also an elected township fiscal officer, who serves a four-year term beginning on April 1 of the year after the election, which is held in November of the year before the presidential election. Vacancies in the fiscal officership or on the board of trustees are filled by the remaining trustees.
