= New Jasper Township, Greene County, Ohio =

Township in Ohio, US

- Township
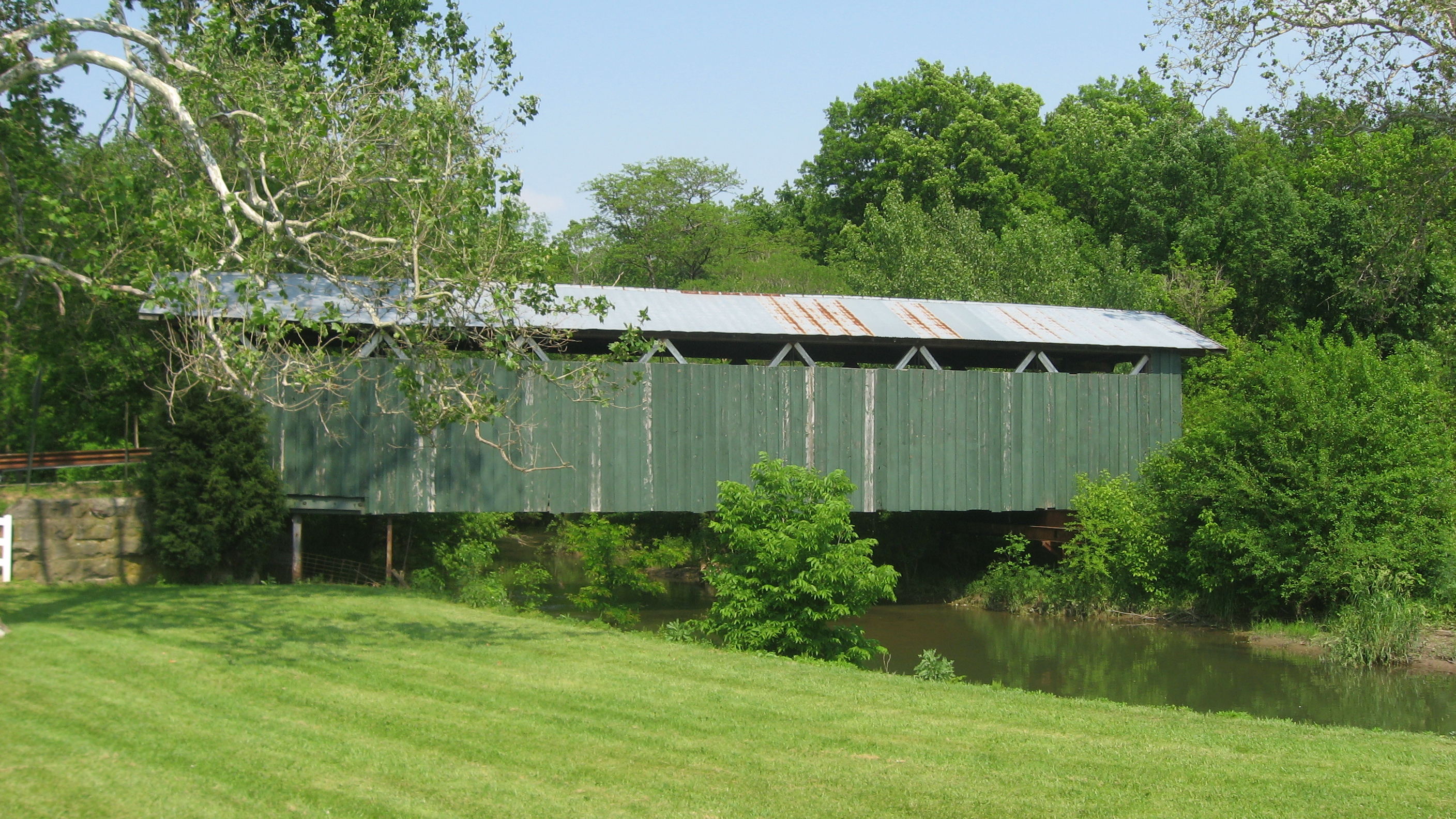
- Ballard Road Covered Bridge, northwest of Jamestown

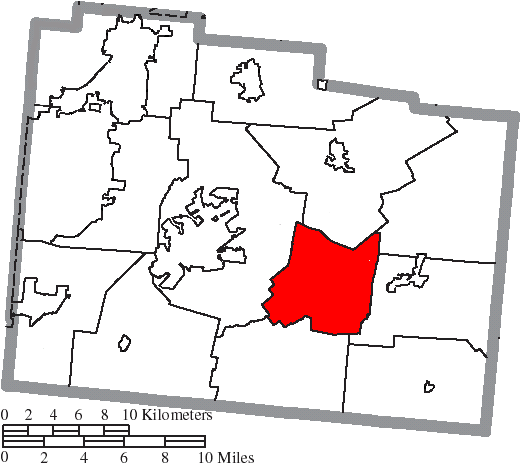
- Location of New Jasper Township in Greene County
- Coordinates: 39°39′21″N 83°48′50″W
- Country: United States
- State: Ohio
- County: Greene

Area
  - Total: 21.6 sq mi (56.0 km^{2})
  - Land: 21.4 sq mi (55.5 km^{2})
  - Water: 0.19 sq mi (0.5 km^{2})
- Elevation: 1,020 ft (311 m)

Population (2020)
  - Total: 2,639
  - Density: 123/sq mi (47.5/km^{2})
- Time zone: UTC-5 (Eastern (EST))
  - Summer (DST): UTC-4 (EDT)
- FIPS code: 39-54810
- GNIS feature ID: 1086170
- Website: www.newjaspertownship.com

New Jasper Township is one of the twelve townships of Greene County, Ohio, United States. As of the 2020 census, the population was 2,639.

== Geography ==
Located in the east central part of the county, it borders the following townships:

- Cedarville Township – north
- Ross Township – northeast
- Silvercreek Township – southeast
- Caesarscreek Township – south
- Xenia Township – west

No municipalities are located in New Jasper Township, although part of the census-designated place of Shawnee Hills is located in the township's east. The unincorporated community of New Jasper is located within the township.

== Name and history ==
New Jasper Township was established in 1853. In the earliest years of this township, limestone was the leading industry in the area due to large limestone deposits. A railroad spur was provided to a large stone quarry near Caesar Creek, and a tile factory was instituted. However, the business had shut down by 1908. The limestone was used largely for agriculture with fertilizer to improve the land.

The New Jasper Fire Department was established in 1951 as a volunteer fire department, and remains so to this day. Grass fires in remote areas pose a concern, and sometimes hydrants are inaccessible; water must come from a stream or be hauled on-site.

It is the only New Jasper Township statewide.

== Demographics ==
As of 2023, the median income in New Jasper Township is $43,431. The median age of residents is 42.9 years, and the poverty rate is 108.

== Government ==
The township is governed by a three-member board of trustees, who are elected in November of odd-numbered years to a four-year term beginning on the following January 1. Two are elected in the year after the presidential election and one is elected in the year before it. There is also an elected township fiscal officer, who serves a four-year term beginning on April 1 of the year after the election, which is held in November of the year before the presidential election. Vacancies in the fiscal officership or on the board of trustees are filled by the remaining trustees.

== Notable people ==
- Darrell McCall, country music singer
