= McDonald Farm (Xenia, Ohio) =

- U.S. National Register of Historic Places
- U.S. Historic district
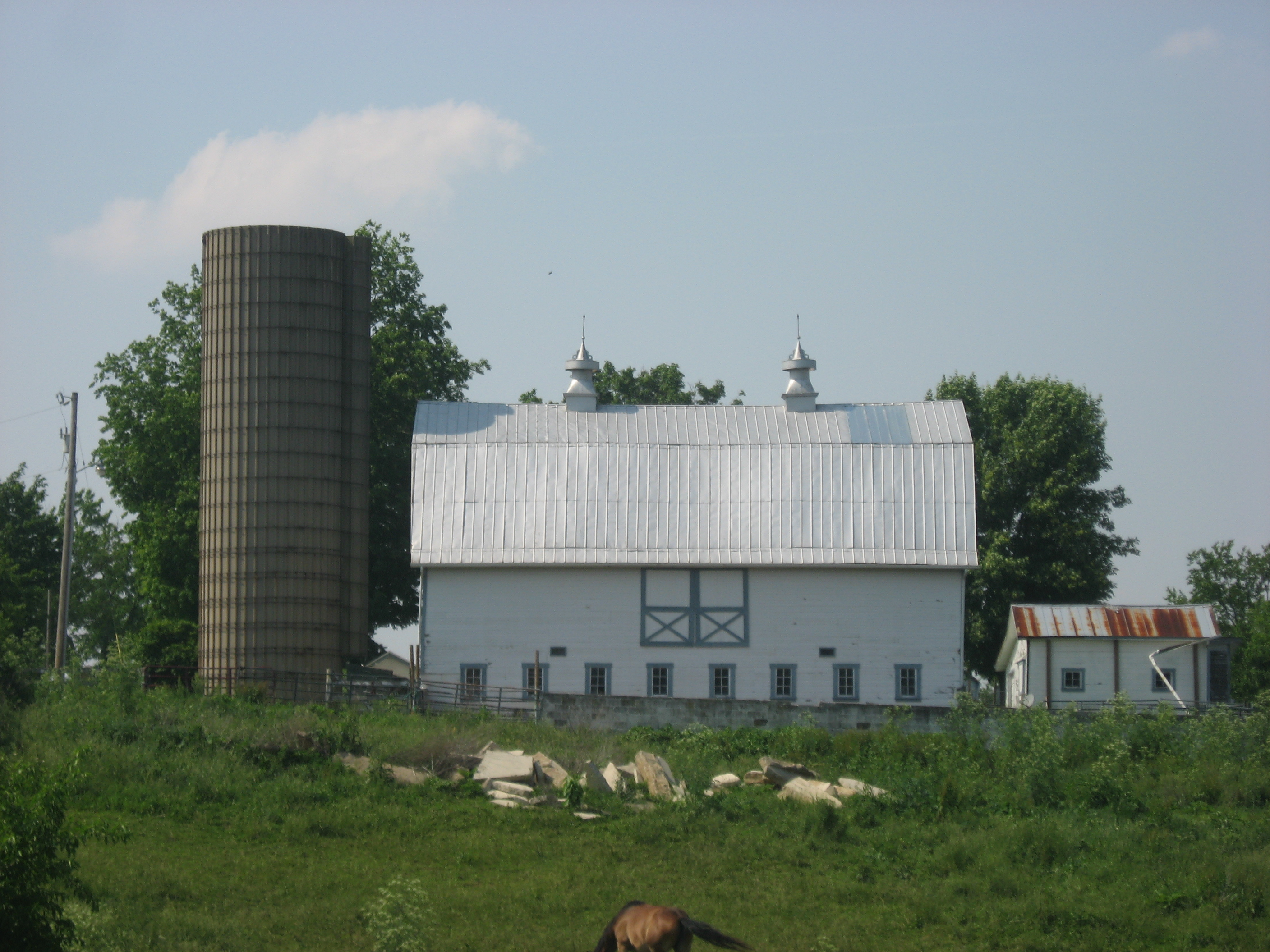
- A silo and barn at the farm

- Location within Ohio Location within the United States
- Location: 1418 Stone Rd., Xenia, Ohio
- Coordinates: 39°38′28″N 83°53′0″W
- Area: 68 acres (28 ha)
- Built: 1829
- Architectural style: Federal, Greek Revival, I-house
- NRHP reference No.: 96000673
- Added to NRHP: June 14, 1996

The McDonald Farm is a historic agricultural complex near the city of Xenia in Greene County, Ohio, United States. It has been named a historic site, largely because of a quarry on the farm, which supplied stone for the Washington Monument.

== Geology ==
Much of Greene County is underlain by Dayton Limestone, a high-quality limestone whose type locality is in the city of Dayton in the adjacent Montgomery County. Farmers in Greene County supplied building stone for local needs through much of the nineteenth century, and by the late 1870s it was being exported to distant localities by the Dayton and Xenia Railroad. Wilford McDonald, who lived about 3.5 miles (5.6 km) south of Xenia, began quarrying limestone from his farm around 1820, after it was exposed by erosion from a nearby small stream. Quarrying revealed limestone deposits as deep as 8 feet (2.4 m) in some places, much of it smoothed by glacial abrasion. The reputation of McDonald's quarry became more prominent than any other source of Greene County limestone; before concrete became prominent as a building material, McDonald supplied substantial amounts of limestone for Xenia buildings, and some of his stone was transported to farther localities. Eventually, McDonald became known as the supplier of one of Ohio's best limestones. Quarrying continued until 1896, when the stream by the quarry flooded it, although a small amount of stone was quarried in the 1930s. Today, the quarry remains filled with water.

== Historic significance ==
In 1849, each of the United States was asked to supply a block of stone for the construction of the Washington Monument. Because McDonald's quarry was known as one of Ohio's best sources of limestone, state geologists decided to supply a block of McDonald stone, and a Xenia mason produced a block measuring 6 × 3 × 0.75 feet (1.83 × 0.91 × 0.23 m) to be sent to Washington, D.C., where it was eventually placed in the monument's interior stairway.

In 1996, the McDonald Farm was listed on the National Register of Historic Places by Margretta Lott Bodewell, great-great-granddaughter of the original owner of the property. It qualified both because of the farm buildings' architecture and because of the farm's place in local history. The architecture of the farm buildings is mixed among multiple architectural styles, including a vernacular I-house and the formal Federal and Greek Revival styles. The historic portion of the farm comprises nine buildings and two sites over an area of 68 acres (28 ha), which is designated a historic district.
