= Miami Township, Greene County, Ohio =

Township in Ohio, US

- Township
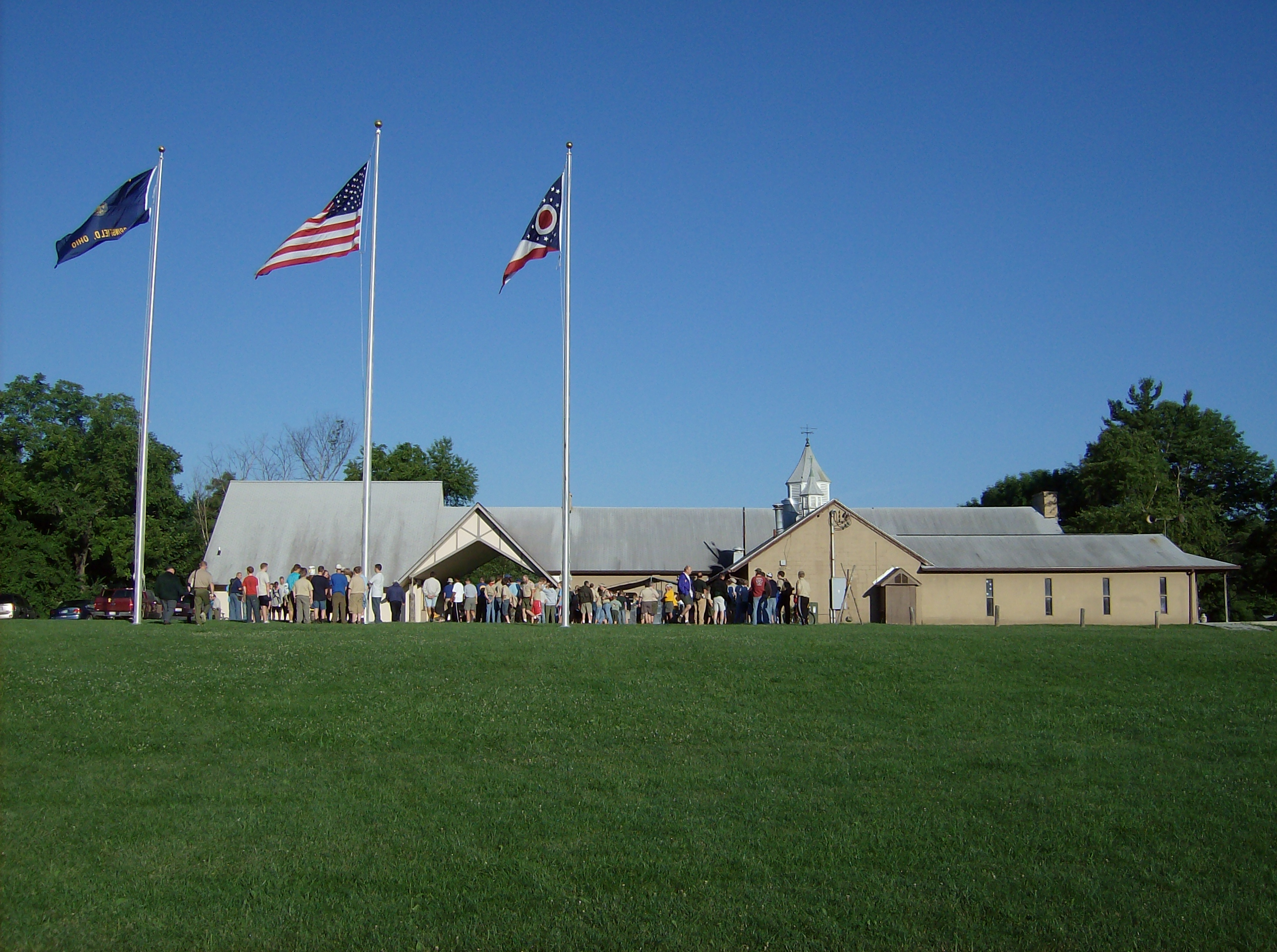
- Camp Hugh Taylor Birch, a Boy Scout camp, is located in Miami Township.

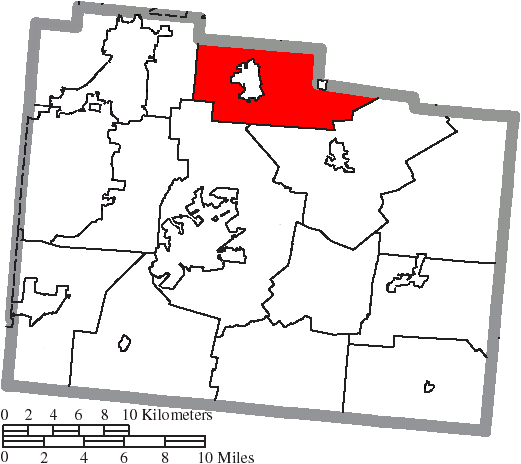
- Location of Miami Township in Greene County
- Coordinates: 39°47′58″N 83°52′30″W
- Country: United States
- State: Ohio
- County: Greene

Area
  - Total: 27.6 sq mi (71.5 km^{2})
  - Land: 27.5 sq mi (71.1 km^{2})
  - Water: 0.15 sq mi (0.4 km^{2})
- Elevation: 1,020 ft (310 m)

Population (2020)
  - Total: 4,933
  - Density: 180/sq mi (69.4/km^{2})
- Time zone: UTC-5 (Eastern (EST))
  - Summer (DST): UTC-4 (EDT)
- FIPS code: 39-49336
- GNIS feature ID: 1086169
- Website: miamitownship.net

Miami Township is one of the twelve townships of Greene County, Ohio, United States. As of the 2020 census the township population was 4,933.

== Geography ==
Located in the northern part of the county, it borders the following townships:

- Green Township, Clark County - northeast
- Cedarville Township - southeast
- Xenia Township - southwest
- Bath Township - west
- Mad River Township, Clark County - northwest

Two villages are located in Miami Township: part of Clifton in the northeast, and Yellow Springs in the center.

== Name and history ==
Miami Township was established in 1808 from land given by Bath and Xenia townships. It takes its name from the Little Miami River.

Statewide, other Miami Townships are located in Clermont, Hamilton, Logan, and Montgomery Counties.

== Government ==
The township is governed by a three-member board of trustees, who are elected in November of odd-numbered years to a four-year term beginning on the following January 1. Two are elected in the year after the presidential election and one is elected in the year before it. There is also an elected township fiscal officer, who serves a four-year term beginning on April 1 of the year after the election, which is held in November of the year before the presidential election. Vacancies in the fiscal officership or on the board of trustees are filled by the remaining trustees.
