= Cedarville Township, Ohio =

Township in Ohio, US

Cedarville Township, Greene County, Ohio
- Township
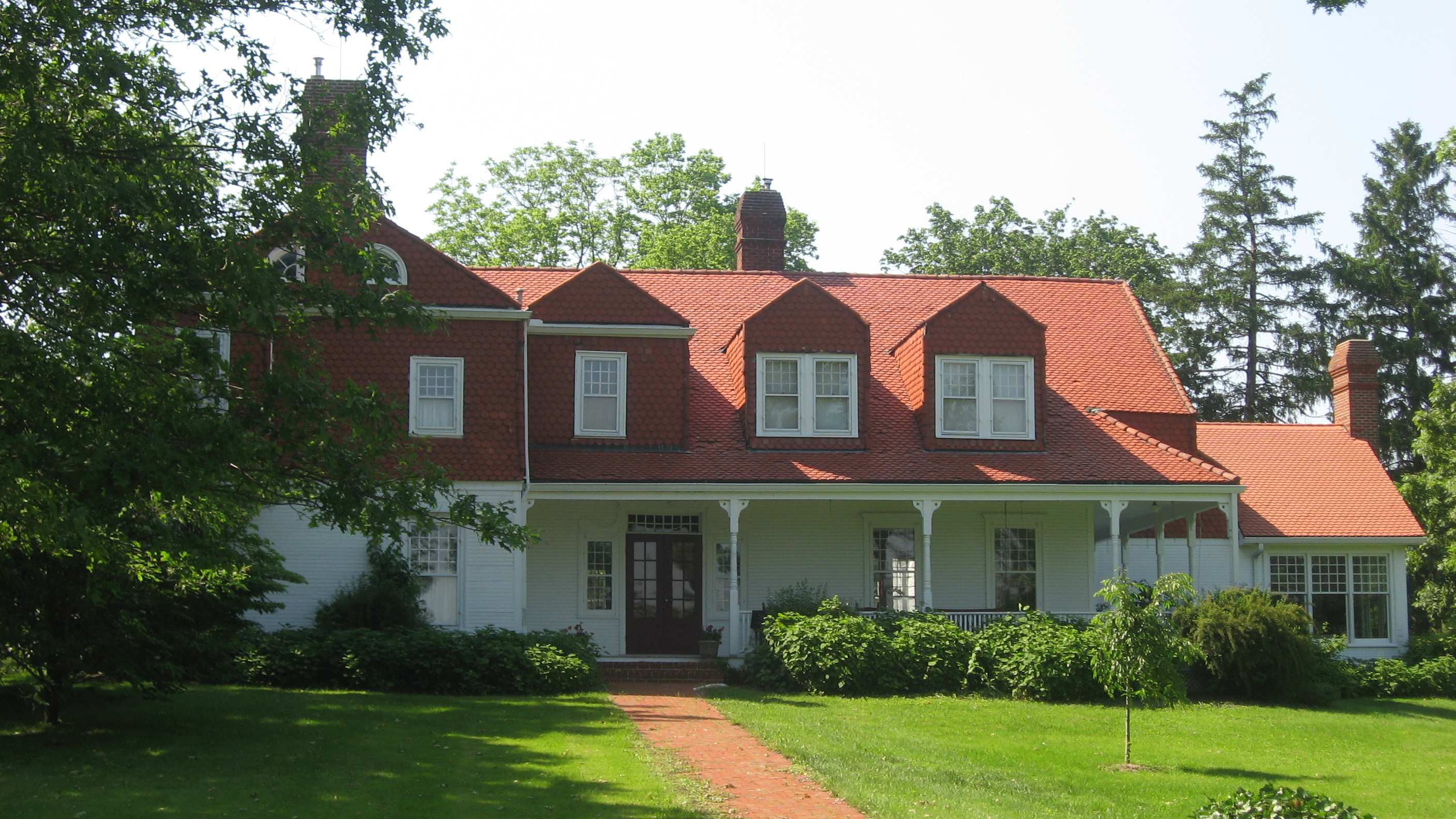
- Home of Whitelaw Reid, northwest of Cedarville

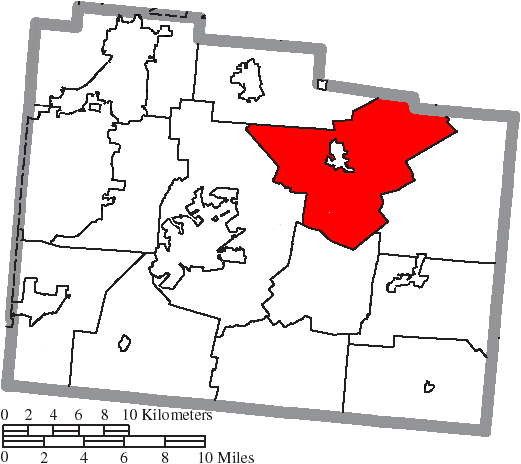
- Location of Cedarville Township in Greene County
- Coordinates: 39°44′20″N 83°48′23″W
- Country: United States
- State: Ohio
- County: Greene

Area
  - Total: 39.3 sq mi (101.7 km^{2})
  - Land: 39.2 sq mi (101.4 km^{2})
  - Water: 0.15 sq mi (0.4 km^{2})
- Elevation: 1,047 ft (319 m)

Population (2020)
  - Total: 5,899
  - Density: 150.7/sq mi (58.18/km^{2})
- Time zone: UTC-5 (Eastern (EST))
  - Summer (DST): UTC-4 (EDT)
- ZIP code: 45314
- Area codes: 937, 326
- FIPS code: 39-12798
- GNIS feature ID: 1086166
- Website: https://www.cedarvilletwp.us/

Cedarville Township is one of the twelve townships of Greene County, Ohio, United States. As of the 2020 census the township population was 5,899.

== Geography ==
Located in the northeastern part of the county, it borders the following townships:

- Green Township, Clark County - north
- Madison Township, Clark County - northeast
- Ross Township - east
- New Jasper Township - south
- Xenia Township - southwest
- Miami Township - northwest

The village of Cedarville is located in central Cedarville Township.

== Name and history ==
Cedarville Township was established in 1850 from land given by Xenia, Miami, and Ross townships.

It is the only Cedarville Township statewide.

== Government ==
The township is governed by a three-member board of trustees, who are elected in November of odd-numbered years to a four-year term beginning on the following January 1. Two are elected in the year after the presidential election and one is elected in the year before it. There is also an elected township fiscal officer, who serves a four-year term beginning on April 1 of the year after the election, which is held in November of the year before the presidential election. Vacancies in the fiscal officership or on the board of trustees are filled by the remaining trustees.

The township trustees meet in the Cedarville Opera House in Cedarville, which serves as the township hall.

== Notable people ==
- Mike DeWine, Governor of Ohio (2018–present)
