= Jamestown, Ohio =

- Village
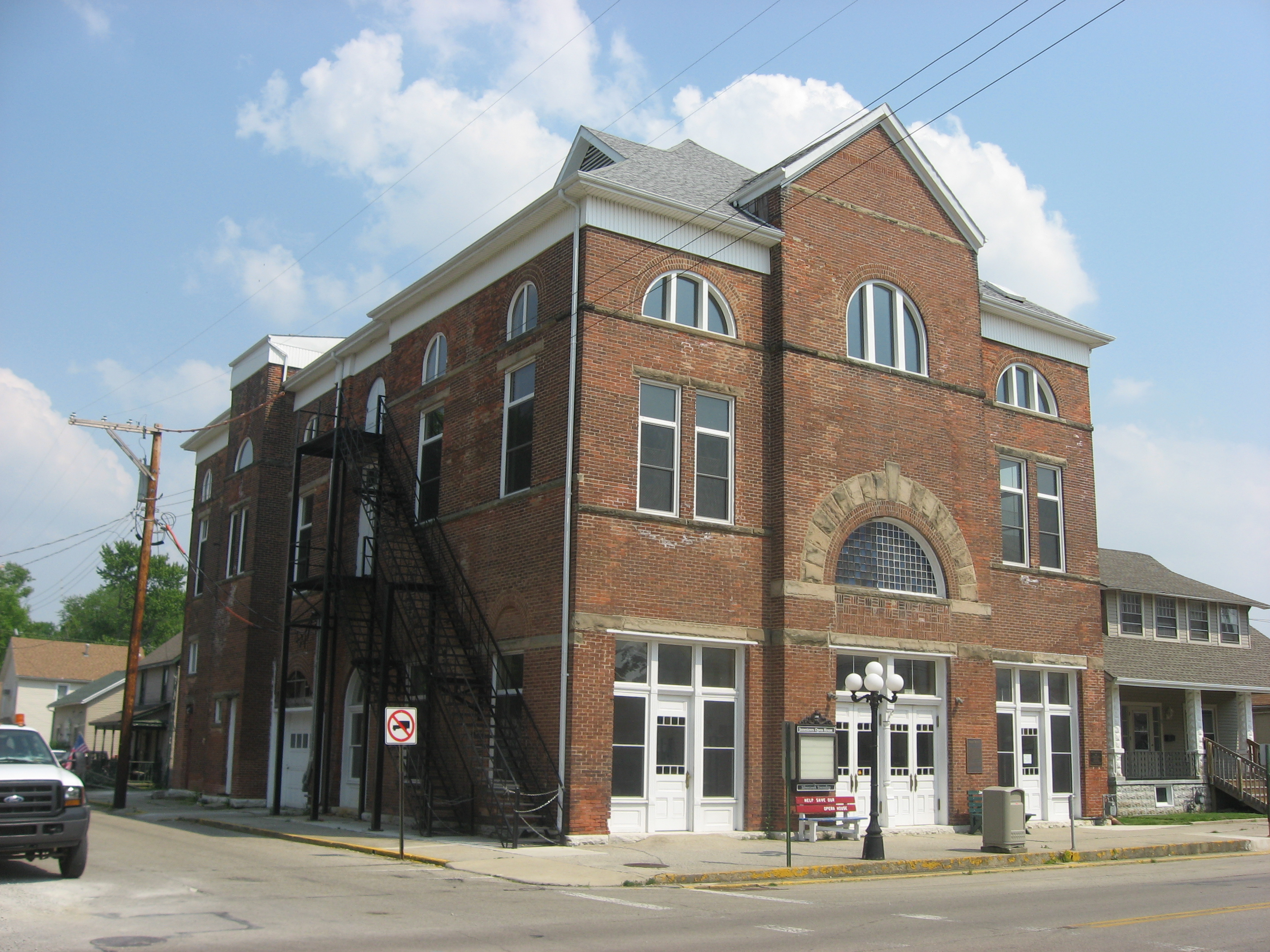
- Jamestown Opera House

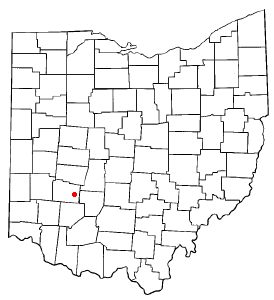
- Location of Jamestown, Ohio

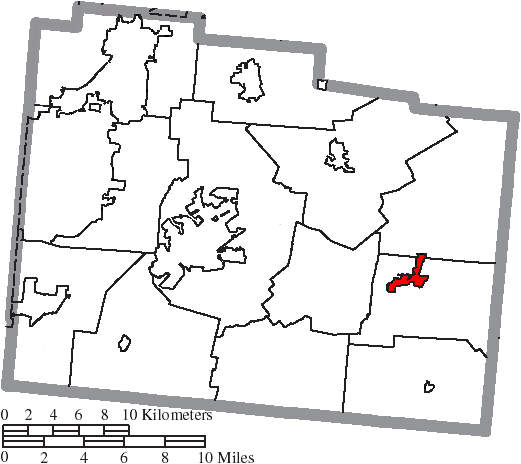
- Location of Jamestown in Greene County
- Coordinates: 39°39′22″N 83°44′55″W
- Country: United States
- State: Ohio
- County: Greene

Government
  - Mayor: Joshua Bradley

Area
  - Total: 1.17 sq mi (3.03 km^{2})
  - Land: 1.17 sq mi (3.02 km^{2})
  - Water: 0.0039 sq mi (0.01 km^{2})
- Elevation: 1,060 ft (320 m)

Population (2020)
  - Total: 2,052
  - Density: 1,761.6/sq mi (680.17/km^{2})
- Time zone: UTC-5 (Eastern (EST))
  - Summer (DST): UTC-4 (EDT)
- ZIP code: 45335
- Area codes: 937, 326
- FIPS code: 39-38374
- GNIS feature ID: 2398290
- Website: https://jamestownohio.us/

Jamestown is a village in Greene County, Ohio, United States. The population was 2,052 at the 2020 census.

Jamestown is part of the Dayton Metropolitan Statistical Area.

== History ==
Jamestown was platted in 1816, and named after Jamestown, Virginia, the native home of a first settler.

== Geography ==
Parts of Jamestown are located in Silvercreek, Ross, and New Jasper Townships.

According to the United States Census Bureau, the village has a total area of 1.21 square miles (3.13 km^{2}), all of it land.

Jamestown is located south of U.S. Route 35 on State Route 72. It is east of Lake Shawnee.

== Demographics ==
Historical population
Census	Pop.	Note	%±
1850	337		—
1860	559		65.9%
1870	532		−4.8%
1880	877		64.8%
1890	1,104		25.9%
1900	1,205		9.1%
1910	1,133		−6.0%
1920	1,039		−8.3%
1930	944		−9.1%
1940	1,079		14.3%
1950	1,345		24.7%
1960	1,730		28.6%
1970	1,790		3.5%
1980	1,702		−4.9%
1990	1,794		5.4%
2000	1,917		6.9%
2010	1,993		4.0%
2020	2,052		3.0%
U.S. Decennial Census

=== 2010 census ===
As of the census of 2010, there were 1,993 people, 758 households, and 524 families living in the village. The population density was 1,647.1 inhabitants per square mile (635.9/km^{2}). There were 836 housing units at an average density of 690.9 per square mile (266.8/km^{2}). The racial makeup of the village was 95.1% White, 2.4% African American, 0.1% Native American, 0.2% Asian, 0.6% from other races, and 1.7% from two or more races. Hispanic or Latino of any race were 0.7% of the population.

There were 758 households, of which 36.5% had children under the age of 18 living with them, 46.8% were married couples living together, 16.8% had a female householder with no husband present, 5.5% had a male householder with no wife present, and 30.9% were non-families. 25.3% of all households were made up of individuals, and 12.3% had someone living alone who was 65 years of age or older. The average household size was 2.56 and the average family size was 3.04.

The median age in the village was 36.7 years. 25.7% of residents were under the age of 18; 9.5% were between the ages of 18 and 24; 25.2% were from 25 to 44; 23.6% were from 45 to 64; and 16% were 65 years of age or older. The gender makeup of the village was 45.3% male and 54.7% female.

=== 2000 census ===
As of the census of 2000, there were 1,917 people, 743 households, and 529 families living in the village. The population density was 1,579.3 inhabitants per square mile (609.8/km^{2}). There were 791 housing units at an average density of 651.7 per square mile (251.6/km^{2}). The racial makeup of the village was 94.47% White, 4.07% African American, 0.42% Native American, 0.47% Asian, 0.16% from other races, and 0.42% from two or more races. Hispanic or Latino of any race were 0.47% of the population.

There were 743 households, out of which 38.0% had children under the age of 18 living with them, 50.3% were married couples living together, 15.3% had a female householder with no husband present, and 28.8% were non-families. 25.0% of all households were made up of individuals, and 12.2% had someone living alone who was 65 years of age or older. The average household size was 2.58 and the average family size was 3.08.

In the village, the population was spread out, with 29.2% under the age of 18, 8.5% from 18 to 24, 30.3% from 25 to 44, 19.5% from 45 to 64, and 12.5% who were 65 years of age or older. The median age was 34 years. For every 100 females there were 92.1 males. For every 100 females age 18 and over, there were 86.9 males.

The median income for a household in the village was $40,599, and the median income for a family was $43,705. Males had a median income of $32,679 versus $21,080 for females. The per capita income for the village was $17,117. About 9.4% of families and 11.2% of the population were below the poverty line, including 13.4% of those under age 18 and 20.1% of those age 65 or over.

== Education ==
The Greeneview Local School District operates three schools in the village: Greeneview Elementary School, Greeneview Middle School, and Greeneview High School. Jamestown has a public library, a branch of the Greene County Public Library.

== Notable natives ==
- Gary Bradds, NBA basketball player
- Terry Bradds, jazz guitarist
- Matt Brown, UFC fighter
- Fred Claire, Los Angeles Dodgers general manager
- Roland James, NFL football player
- Grace Norman, Paralympic paratriathlete
