= Yellow Springs Historic District =

Historic district in Ohio, United States

- U.S. National Register of Historic Places
- U.S. Historic district
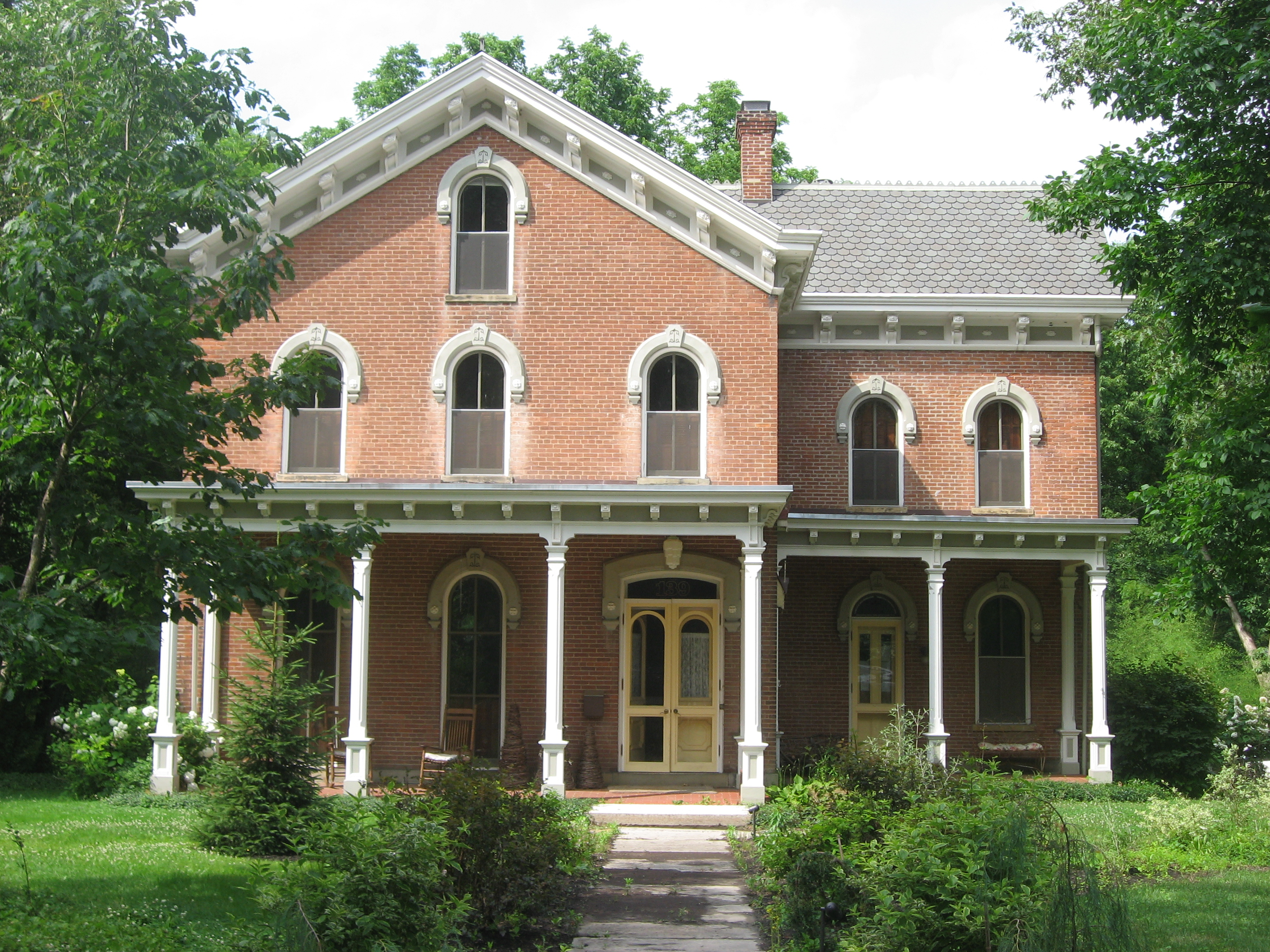
- A typical house in the district

- Location within Ohio Location within the United States
- Location: Roughly bounded by RR tracks, Yellow Springs-Fairfield Rd., High and Herman Sts., Yellow Springs, Ohio
- Coordinates: 39°48′10″N 83°53′22″W
- Area: 460.5 acres (186.4 ha)
- Architectural style: Greek Revival, Italianate, Federal
- NRHP reference No.: 82003573
- Added to NRHP: April 1, 1982

The Yellow Springs Historic District is a large historic district that encompasses the majority of the village of Yellow Springs, Ohio, United States.

== Development ==
Yellow Springs began to grow in the 1840s. Until 1846, the community was composed of a church and two or three houses, but the mineral spring in Glen Helen began to attract those who wanted to take the cure of the mineral waters. The erection of a store in 1846 and the construction of the Little Miami Railroad near the springs prompted the community to prosper, even though no land had yet been platted. The core of the village gradually moved westward onto the hills above the spring and near the Little Miami tracks, and with the construction of brick houses, Yellow Springs gradually assumed the appearance of a settled locality. The village was finally surveyed in 1853, and all extant buildings date from this period or later. Antioch College was incorporated in 1852, and after Yellow Springs' residents pledged money and free land for the college, the trustees accepted their offer, and the oldest buildings were finished in late 1853.

By 1856, the village was experiencing its golden age, and much of its extant architecture reflects the popular architectural styles of the day. Growth began to taper off in the wake of the Civil War, as can be seen in the history of the Neff House, one of Yellow Springs' most prominent buildings. Constructed in 1840 to serve users of the springs from Cincinnati and Columbus, it burned during the war, and only in 1870 could the owner rebuild. Although his magnificent replacement building had more rooms than all of Greene County's other hotels put together, and although its first few years saw a large clientele, business dropped so much by 1890 that the owner arranged for the hotel to be dismantled and shipped to Cincinnati in 1892.

== Recent history ==
Today, many of Yellow Springs' buildings are examples of the Federal or Greek Revival styles, although vernacular buildings, such as its plentiful I-houses, are numerous. Most of its commercial district was built after the golden age, making its styles more heterogenous than business districts in comparable communities.

In 1982, the Yellow Springs Historic District was designated and listed on the National Register of Historic Places, both because of its place in the area's history and because of its historic architecture. The district embraces the majority of the village, beginning at the railroad line and continuing several blocks westward, including both sides of U.S. Route 68 and much of the Antioch College campus. A total of 473 buildings are included within the district's boundaries; 261 qualified as contributing properties in 1982, and 212 were considered non-contributing. Antioch, North, and South Halls on the college campus, which are separately listed on the National Register, are included in the district, but Yellow Springs' other National Register property, the South School, is not.
