= Alice Carr =

Alice Carr may refer to:

- Alice Comyns Carr (1850–1927), British costume designer
- Alice Griffith Carr (1887–1968), American nurse
- Alice Robertson Carr de Creeft (1899–1996), American sculptor
