= Felker =

Felker is a surname. Notable people with the surname include:

- Butch Felker (1945–2008), American politician
- Clay Felker (1925–2008), American magazine editor and journalist
- Ellis Wayne Felker (1948–1996), American man convicted of murder
- Evan Felker (1984–), American musician
- Samuel D. Felker (1859–1932), American lawyer
- William Felker (born 1940), American professor

== See also ==
- Felker's Falls
- Félker is the Hungarian name for Felcheriu village, Oșorhei Commune, Bihor County, Romania
