= Young's Jersey Dairy =

Family-operated dairy farm in Yellow Springs, Ohio

Coordinates: 39°49′38.7″N 83°52′13.7″W

Young's Jersey Dairy is a family-operated dairy farm and restaurant located in Yellow Springs, Ohio.

== History ==
The Young family farm was established in 1869, which was when they built the property's iconic red barn. During the Great Depression, the Young family was forced to sell the farm to their neighbors. However, the family purchased the property again after World War II. The Young's Jersey Dairy company began in 1946. Beginning in the 1950s, the family began selling milk from their dairy operations, expanding to cheese and some food items such as sandwiches and hot dogs in the 1960s. They started selling ice cream in 1981, for which they are best known today. In 2019, the farm celebrated its 150th anniversary, for which Ohio Governor Mike DeWine presented the business with a proclamation.

== Visitor attractions ==
Young's Jersey Dairy has several visitor attractions outside the scope of a typical dairy farm, including batting cages and miniature golf. The farm also has a petting zoo where visitors can interact with cows, goats, and pigs. They also have fall seasonal activities such as a corn maze, pumpkin picking, and wagon rides, as well as winter seasonal activities like allowing guests to cut their own Christmas trees.

== Production and statistics ==
Young's Jersey Dairy produces about 75,000 US gallons (280,000 L) of ice cream per year and approximately 44,000 pounds (20,000 kg) of cheese. Half of all their cheese produced is sold as cheese curds. They maintain a herd of approximately 50 Jersey cows; the milk from the cows is used to produce their cheese. The milk used to make their ice cream is purchased from Reiter Dairy. The property has a black walnut tree plantation of around 100 trees as well as a plantation of around 20,000 white pines that are used as Christmas trees.

In the summer when it does the most business, it employs approximately 320 workers. As of 2009, Young's Jersey Dairy had over one million visitors per year.

== Awards and honors ==
In 2009, Lauren Heaton of the Yellow Springs News called Young's Jersey Dairy "one of the most successful family-operated businesses in the region". In 2017, the Best of Springfield judged that Young's Jersey Dairy was the best local attraction, as well as best "kid's fun". In 2018, Ohio Magazine held a public poll for its readers to vote on the best ice cream in Ohio; Young's Jersey Dairy was the winner of the poll.
