= Kristina Knickerbocker =

American politician (born 1991)

- Knickerbocker in 2026

Member-elect of the U.S. House of Representatives from Ohio's 10th district
- Assuming office January 3, 2027
- Succeeding: Mike Turner

Personal details
- Born: Kristina Nicole Montgomery; January 16, 1991 (age 35) Los Angeles County, California, U.S.
- Party: Democratic
- Spouse: Bret Knickerbocker (m. 2018)
- Children: 2
- Education: University of Southern California (attended); Azusa Pacific University (BS); Ohio State University (MS)

Military service
- Branch/service: United States Air Force
- Years of service: 2015–2025
- Rank: Major
- Unit: 88th Air Base Wing; 445th Aeromedical Staging Squadron

Kristina Nicole Knickerbocker (née Montgomery; born January 16, 1991) is the Democratic member-elect of the United States House of Representatives for Ohio's 10th congressional district, based in Dayton. She is also a nurse practitioner.

== Early life and career ==
Knickerbocker was born in Los Angeles County, California, January 16, 1991. She studied at the University of Southern California, finished her bachelor's at Azusa Pacific University (December 2014), and earned her master's at Ohio State University.

Knickerbocker served in the United States Air Force and was stationed at Wright-Patterson Air Force Base, serving with the 88th Air Base Wing and 445th Aeromedical Staging Squadron. She settled in Yellow Springs, Ohio, near Wright-Patterson.

== Political career ==
In January 2026, Knickerbocker announced her candidacy for Ohio's 10th congressional district. During her 2026 campaign, Knickerbocker advocated reducing the health risks of air pollution, extreme heat, and unsafe drinking water – particularly in underserved communities. In May 2026, she won the Democratic primary against five other candidates. She defeated 12-term Republican incumbent Mike Turner in the November 3 general election. Although Turner carried Greene County and the District 10's portion of Butler County, Knickerbocker's roughly 19,000-vote margin in Montgomery County gave her an overall victory margin of about 4,900 votes.

== Bibliography ==
=== References ===
- Dayton Daily News. Dayton, Ohio. ISSN 0897-0920; OCLC 232118157 (all editions).
1. Gnau, Thomas (April 2, 2026) [updated Apr 3, 2026]. "Election 2026: Six Democrats on May Ballot Vying to Face Rep. Turner in November" (blog ed.).
2. Gnau, Thomas (October 3, 2026) [updated October 19, 2026]. "Who Should Represent Dayton Area in Congress? Here's Who's on the Ballot" (blog ed.).
3. Gnau, Thomas (October 8, 2026). "Election 2026: Three Running to Represent Ohio's Redrawn 10th in Congress". Vol. 149, no. 360 (digital/print version of October 3, 2026, blog ed.). p. 6 (section A).
  1. Via Newspapers.com.
  2. Via ProQuest 3397885170 (collection → Historical Newspapers: Global)
4. Gnau, Thomas (November 4, 2026) [updated November 4, 2026]. "Knickerbocker Declares Victory Over Turner" (blog ed.).
5. Gnau, Thomas (November 5, 2026). "Election 2026: Turner Trailing in Tight House Race – Landsman, Leonard Win in Warren and Clark Counties". Vol. 150, no. 23 (digital/print version of November 4, 2026, blog ed.). pp. 1 & 10 (section A).
  1. Via ProQuest 3409675973 (collection → Historical Newspapers: Global)
- Fairborn Daily Herald; Espinosa, Jacob (May 6, 2026). "Knickerbocker Wins Dem Primary" (blog ed.). Fairborn, Ohio. OCLC 17358734 (all editions).
- Inland Valley Daily Bulletin. Ontario, California. LCCN sn96-64434; OCLC 27008841 (all editions), OCLC 947078831 (all editions) (blog eds.).
1. "Area Residents Gain College Honors, Degrees". December 18, 2014.
  1. Via Internet Archive (Wayback Machine). Archived from the original on November 21, 2026.
- LCV (League of Conservation Voters). Bio: "House Representative Kristina Knickerbocker, OH-10". Archived from the original on November 21, 2026.
- LegiStorm. "Incoming Rep. Kristina Knickerbocker".
- NBC News (November 3, 2026). "Ohio House District 10 midterm election results".
- WHIO-TV; Horn, Noelle (November 5, 2026). "Election 2026: Kristina Knickerbocker to Represent Dayton in Congress, AP Reports".
- WKEF TV (channel 22); Herman, Kaitlyn (January 14, 2026). "Kristina Knickerbocker Enters Race Against Mike Turner for Seat in Congress".
- YSNews.com; Dixon, Reilly (April 24, 2026). "Villager Runs for Congress" (online ed. of the Yellow Springs News). Yellow Springs, Ohio.

U.S. House of Representatives
Preceded by Mike Turner	Member of the U.S. House of Representatives from Ohio's 10th congressional district Taking office 2027	Elect
