= Neal Vernon Loving =

African -American racing pilot

Neal Vernon Loving (1916–1998) was an American racing pilot. He is the first African-American and the first double amputee to be licensed as a racing pilot. He was also known for his work as an inventor and aeronautical engineer.

== Early life ==
Loving was born in Detroit, Michigan on February 4, 1916. His father, Harding Clay Loving, was the first black optometrist in Michigan. Loving became interested in aviation at age ten, when a de Havilland biplane flew over his house. He attended Cass Technical High School, where he studied aeronautics.

== Aviation career ==
After graduating high school, Loving took a job with his former aeromechanics teacher, George Tabraham. He became a licensed aircraft mechanic, and began to build a ground trainer aircraft. Loving's trainer received Mechanix Illustrated's Project of the Month award and was displayed at the Detroit City Airport. In 1936, he was hired by the Detroit Department of Recreation to teach model aircraft building. He continued his own education with an accelerated course in drafting and engineering at Highland Park Junior College.

Loving was rejected from both the U.S. Air Cadet Corps and Detroit's Cass Aero Club because of his race. He joined the Ace Flying Club, an organization for black aviators, where he met fellow aviator Earsly Taylor. The two would become close friends and business partners.

After Tabraham became head of the Aero Mechanics High School, he hired Loving as an instructor. As with his previous job, Loving taught model aircraft building. He was the first black teacher at the school, which had an all-white student body at the time. Loving said in an interview that he initially taught only boys, until "the girls found out that my class was fun and wanted to join. The authorities didn't want a black man teaching white girls but the principal put his foot down and girls got in my class."

While still teaching high school, Loving co-founded the Wayne Aircraft Company with Taylor. It was the first black-owned aircraft company in Michigan. Like Loving, Taylor had another full-time job, so progress was slow.

Loving and Taylor joined the Civil Air Patrol during World War II. After being rejected by the local squadrons because of their race, they formed their own, all-black group, Squadron 639-5. With Loving as executive officer and Taylor as commanding officer, the squadron provided flight training, pre-military training, and classes in parachute jumping. For the latter, they were nicknamed the Parachute Squadron.

In 1943, Loving was laid off from the Aero Mechanics High School. He began working seven days a week on the Ford Motor Company's assembly line, while still working at the Wayne Aircraft Company and training pilots for the Civil Air Patrol. With little time to rest, Loving developed long-term fatigue.

On July 30, 1944, Loving set out on a routine flight at Wings Airport in Utica, Michigan. Flying on only two hours of sleep, he failed to realize he had lost too much altitude. Loving's glider crashed, crushing his legs. Both legs were amputated below the knee, and Loving spent eighteen months in the hospital. He and Taylor closed the Wayne Aircraft Company during this time.

A month after being fitted with wooden prosthetics, Loving was approved for a driver's license. By 1946, he was flying again. He once said that "the nice thing about artificial legs is that you can be as tall as you like and wear any shoe size you want."

Loving and Taylor opened the Wayne School of Aeronautics in 1947.

Over the course of his career, Loving designed and flew five aircraft. In 1949, he began building a midget-class racer called Loving's Love. Loving's Love had a single seat and inverted gull wings, and could reach speeds of 215–255 miles per hour. Loving entered it in the 1951 National Air Races, becoming the first double amputee and the first African-American licensed as a racing pilot. Loving's Love won the Experimental Aircraft Association's Most Outstanding Design award in 1955.

In either 1953 or 1954, Loving flew Loving's Love to Kingston, Jamaica to visit Taylor, who had opened a flying school there with her new husband, Carl Barnett. Loving later married Carl's sister, Clare Therese Barnett.

In 1955, Loving enrolled in Wayne State University as an aeronautical engineering major. He closed the Wayne School of Aeronautics two years later. After graduating, Loving became an engineer at the Wright-Patterson Air Force Base, where he worked on methods of measuring clear-air turbulence.

== Personal life ==
Loving married Clare Therese Barnett in 1955. They adopted two children, Paul Leslie and Michelle Stephanie. The family settled in Yellow Springs, Ohio. Loving continued to fly for nine years after his retirement, until heart problems caused his license to be revoked. Clare Loving was reportedly "more worried about his daily bike excursions around town than his adventures in the air." Loving lived in Yellow Springs until his death from colon cancer in 1998.

== Recognition and award ==
Loving's Love is displayed at the Experimental Aircraft Association Air Education Museum in Oshkosh, Wisconsin. In 2000, the Neal V. Loving scholarship was created to help high school students from Maryland's Upper Shore attend the Patrick School of Aeronautics.

- Meritorious Civilian Service Award
- Michigan Aviation Hall of Fame
- Wayne State University College of Engineering Hall of Fame
- Organization of Black Airline Pilots Distinguished Achievement Award
- Experimental Aircraft Association Homebuilders Hall of Fame
