= Antioch School (Yellow Springs, Ohio) =

Oldest democratic school in the United States

Location
- 1160 Corry St; Yellow Springs, (Greene County), Ohio 45387; United States
- Coordinates: 39°47′40″N 83°53′8″W

Information
- Type: democratic free school, coeducational elementary school
- Established: 1921
- Administrator: Nathan Summers
- Teaching staff: 8
- Age range: 3.5-12
- Accreditation: Alternative Education Resource Organization
- Website: antiochschool.org

The Antioch School is the oldest democratic school in the United States. The school is located in Yellow Springs, Ohio and was founded in 1921 through Antioch College.

== History ==
Prior to the official founding of the Antioch School, Antioch College operated a school called "Little Antioch" for the children of faculty founded during the tenure of the first president of the college, Horace Mann. It was founded to counteract traditional American education by promoting progressive education principles.

In 1921, the school was reorganized as a laboratory school for the college and renamed the Antioch School by college president Arthur Ernest Morgan. Morgan first began his path in experimental education in 1917 when he founded the Moraine Park School in Dayton. The school was located at the mansion of Judge William E. Mills and students from elementary to high school were supervised by college faculty. Student teachers, including Coretta Scott King, were able to have autonomy over their classrooms due to the distributed hierarchy of the school.

The school was the first democratic school in the United States with children directing their own learning. Students were involved in democratic meetings where they participate in the self governing of the school. They were divided into three groups according to social maturity and charged a yearly tuition with access to scholarships.

In 1929, the school moved to Bryan High School and only enrolled elementary students. In 1950, the Antioch School moved to a new building designed by Eero Saarinen and Max Mercer with three classrooms, meeting space, and porch.

In 1969, a teacher purchased a used unicycle and it became emblematic of the school as a way for students to challenge themselves to succeed at something new, different, and difficult. Since the first unicycle, the school acquired them in various sizes for students of all ages.

The school became independent of Antioch College in 1979 when the college was having financial solvency issues and ended its role in the school's education program. Members of the Yellow Springs community helped the school purchase the school building in 1985, and the institution became an independent school during that decade.

In October 2024, the school made a deal with Antioch College to add a 5.3-acre tract to the school's existing 4-acre campus. The tract had for decades been used informally for the school's outdoor education efforts. The school's enrollment at that point in time was 50 students.

== Program ==
The Antioch School offers programs for nursery, kindergarten, and two mixed-age groups of students ages 6–12. The school is run democratically developed through the principles of child-centered learning where students create curriculum and make rules with oversight from teachers. Students resolve conflicts with each other through mediation and grades are not administered.

== Notable alumni ==
- John Lithgow
- Tucker Viemeister
