= Yellow Springs High School =

Public, coeducational high school in Yellow Springs, Ohio, United States

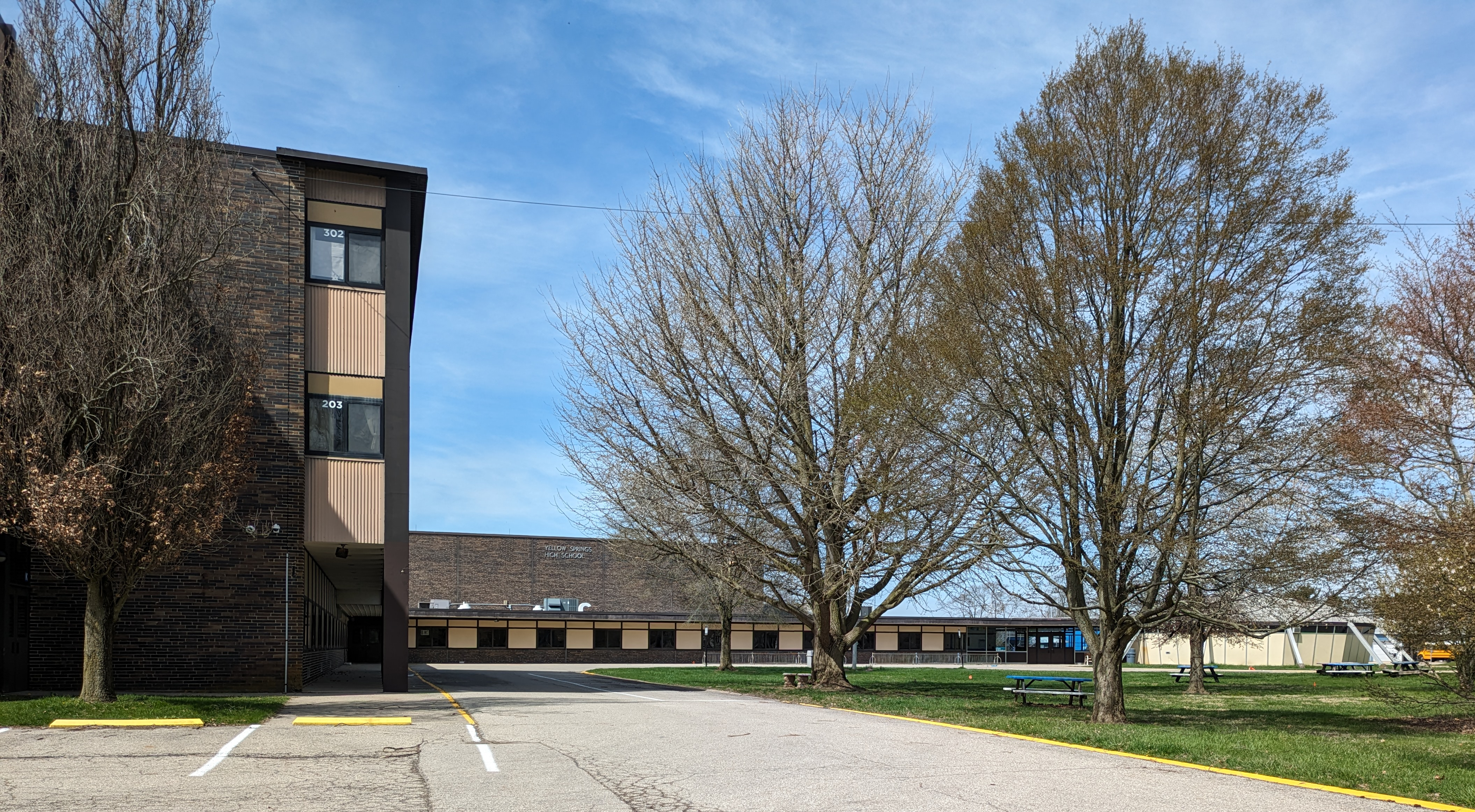

Location
- 420 East Enon Road; Yellow Springs, (Greene County), Ohio 45387; United States
- Coordinates: 39°47′57″N 83°54′31″W

Information
- Type: Public, Coeducational high school
- School district: Yellow Springs Exempted Village Schools
- Authority: Yellow Springs Board of Education
- Superintendent: Terri Holden
- Principal: Jack Hatert
- Teaching staff: 18.50 (on an FTE basis)
- Grades: 7-12
- Enrollment: 329 (2023–2024)
- Student to teacher ratio: 17.78
- Colors: Blue and white
- Athletics conference: Metro Buckeye Conference
- Team name: Bulldogs
- Accreditation: North Central Association of Colleges and Schools
- Website: ysmhs.ysschools.org

Yellow Springs High School is a public high school in Yellow Springs, Ohio. It is the only high school in the Yellow Springs Exempted Village Schools district, teaching grades 9–12. Their mascot is a bulldog.

The school is part of the Metro Buckeye Conference in Ohio. The sports played by the high school's athletic teams are soccer, volleyball, track and field, cross country, basketball, softball, baseball, swimming, tennis, and bowling.

== History ==
From 1858 until 1872, the high school met in Yellow Springs' South School.

== Ohio High School Athletic Association State Championships ==
- Boys Track and Field – 1975, 1985, 1990, 1992, 1993, 1996, 1997
