= William Felker =

- Born: June 26, 1940 (age 85); Hennepin, Minnesota, US

William Felker (born June 26, 1940) is an American former professor at Central State University, and author.

== Life ==
William Felker was born in Hennepin County, Minnesota to Robert Felker and Mary Keefe. Felker went to college at University of Minnesota and got his BA in Philosophy and MA in foreign languages and area studies. Felker also went on to get his PhD in foreign languages and history at the University of Tennessee. In mid-1978, Felker moved to Yellow Springs, Ohio where he began to write Poor Will's Almanack. Throughout his career he has won three awards including one from the Ohio Newspaper Association.

== Poor Will's Almanack ==
Felker's Poor Will's Almanack currently appears in fifteen regional and national publications including the Yellow Springs News In the almanac Felker writes about everything from phenology to gardening and animal husbandry. The almanac began in 1972 with the gift of a barometer from his wife. Felker began to graph and record the barometric pressure and its relation to the weather.

In these records, he began to see patterns in the number of cold fronts each month. His notes later developed into a nature almanac for the local newspaper. These articles evolved into an almanac that was first published in 2003. In the almanac Felker writes about everything from phenology to gardening and animal husbandry. Felker now reads segments of his almanac on radio station WYSO. Bill publishes his notes from over the years in a series of monthly books.

== Home is the Prime Meridian ==
A mission to organize his most meaningful newspaper essays resulted in a collection of 40 articles that Felker wrote throughout the years.
