= WYSO =

- Yellow Springs, Ohio; United States
- Broadcast area: Dayton, Ohio
- Frequency: 91.3 MHz (HD Radio)
- Branding: 91.3 WYSO

Programming
- Format: NPR/public radio
- Subchannels: HD2: Variety "Novaphonic.FM"
- Affiliations: NPR; Public Radio International; BBC World Service

Ownership
- Owner: Miami Valley Public Media

History
- First air date: 1958
- Former call signs: none
- Call sign meaning: Yellow Springs, Ohio

Technical information
- Licensing authority: FCC
- Facility ID: 2374
- Class: B
- ERP: 50,000 watts
- HAAT: 174 meters (571 ft)
- Transmitter coordinates: 39°40′19″N 84°4′34.4″W

Links
- Public license information: Public file; LMS
- Webcast: Listen Live
- Website: wyso.org

WYSO (91.3 FM) is a radio station in Yellow Springs, Ohio, near Dayton. It is owned by Miami Valley Public Media, a community group who acquired it from founding owner Antioch College in 2019. It is the flagship NPR member station for the Miami Valley, including the cities of Dayton and Springfield. On the air since 1958, it has the distinction of being located in one of the smallest communities to host a full NPR member station. WYSO broadcasts in the HD Radio format. WYSO was originally on 91.5 MHz. It moved to 91.3 MHz in 1980.

== History ==
WYSO started in February 1958 as a 10-watt station located at the student union building of Antioch College, on the air for only 4 hours a day. The station increased power from 16-watts to 360 watts in 1960, and the introduction of permanent paid staff began a move towards reflecting and serving a larger community. At that time, WYSO was known as a community-based college radio station. Significantly, several Antioch College students and other volunteers took it upon themselves to be involved with an incipient community and public radio movement in the United States. Several of those individuals have occupied key positions since that time—out of proportion to the Dayton market’s modest size.

For its first decade-and-a-half, all of the station's programming was locally originated. The station had carried live Metropolitan Opera radio broadcasts, ad hoc networks set up by anti-Vietnam War activists, and a few recorded syndicated programs. "WYSO People's News" a local news program, was aired in the 1970s and 1980s. The rest of WYSO's program schedule was taken up by eclectic and block programming. As at other community radio stations in the United States, the prospect of joining NPR was viewed with suspicion by some insiders, but the attendant money from the Corporation for Public Broadcasting led to a permanent staff and a local fundraising mandate.

WYSO became an NPR member station and started broadcasting All Things Considered in 1973. The eventual popularity of NPR's news and information programming was not foreseen at the time and there were discussions about how the newly energized medium of noncommercial radio would best serve the community. The topic of local versus national origination was an important, but not the only, subject of debate. Of note, the decision to replace morning Bluegrass music, local and unique to the region, with network news in the morning was undertaken in the late 1980s. Tom and Jim Duffee and other local bluegrass musicians introduced the genre on WYSO around 1970, and it was embraced by management at the time as a link with the larger Southwest Ohio community.

In 1991, under the direction of General Manager Brian Gibbons and Program Director Ruth Dawson Yellowhawk, WYSO began the process to increase power from 10,000 watts to 37,000 watts, with permits to go up to 50,000, boosting its footprint to the entire Greater Dayton area and the Miami Valley. However, with an increased potential audience, the station was subsequently placed on a list in 1995 to lose CPB funding as part of a political focus on public broadcasting funding by the 104th United States Congress led by House Speaker Newt Gingrich, who promised to zero out CPB funding. Eighty public radio stations were initially listed for defunding due to either a lack of audience or a lack of fundraising. Controversial program changes during this period by Station Manager Norm Beeker, including adding programs such as Fresh Air, This American Life and Marketplace, cancelling Pacifica News and moving to a 24-hour broadcast with the BBC World Service overnight, increased the WYSO audience, the station established new highs in listener support, and the station was removed from the so-called "dis" list in 1998.

In the spring of 2002, a group of listeners formed "Keep WYSO Local" in response to cutbacks to local programming by GM Steve Spencer. The cutbacks included canceling volunteer-hosted shows like the evening jazz program, "Alternate Takes" and "Women in Music," which started in 1975 and was one of the country's longest running shows dedicated to women producers and musicians. Those changes made room on the WYSO schedule to carry the national music program World Cafe. The changes led to protests in the Yellow Springs community as the group debated the future of the station with the university.

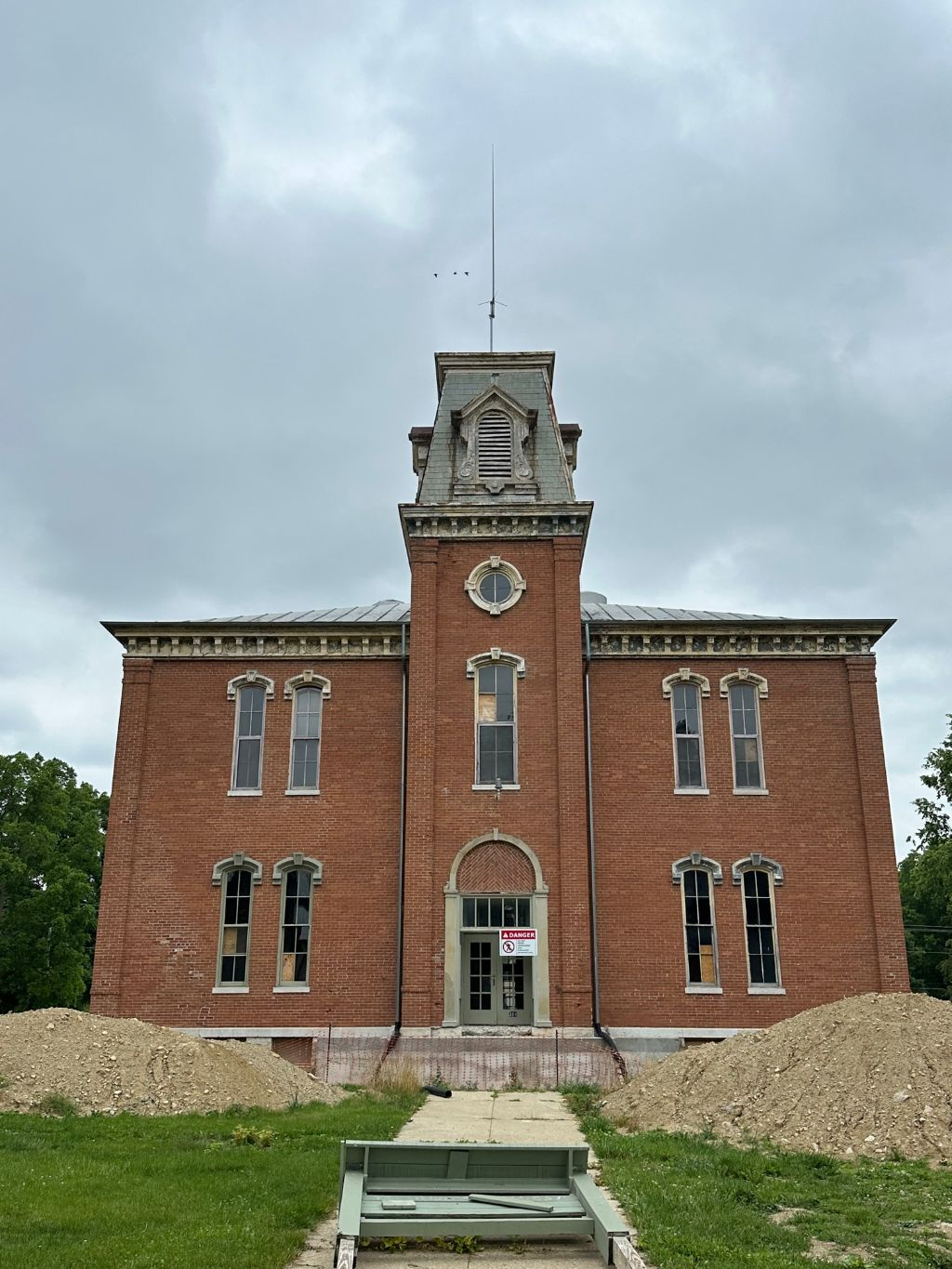
Union School House during renovation June 2023

In 2019, General Manager Neenah Ellis, working with leadership from the station, college and community, helped lead a process for WYSO to become independently owned, though still operated from the Antioch's Yellow Springs campus. In exchange, the college received $3.5 million as compensation. The station continued working in collaboration with the college by remaining in the campus's Kettering Building and offering an internship program for college students. Meanwhile, Antioch students have revived the low-watt radio station on campus — called Anti-Watt — which can be heard on 101.5 FM or streamed online.

In July 2021, after tripling its reporting staff in the prior 18 months, the station announced it was relocating out of the leaking and maintenance-needy Kettering Building on the Antioch College campus and into the Union School House owned by Iron Table Holdings, which in turn was owned by Yellow Springs resident and comedian Dave Chappelle. The building, built in 1872, was being fully renovated, and a two-story addition was being constructed on the west side. WYSO made its first broadcast from the new facility on March 18, 2026, and had officially relocated by the first week of April. The station is located on the first two floors of the original School House structure, plus the first floor of the two-story addition, about 19,000 square feet in all. WYSO spent about $4 million for its portion of the expense, plus higher rent than at the Antioch location.

Separately, the station opened an auxiliary 500-square-foot storefront in Dayton in August of 2024.

WYSO is a 50,000–watt station broadcasting 24/7 and reaching fourteen counties in southwest Ohio with a potential audience of nearly two million. As of early 2026, WYSO employs 23 full-time staffers, more than a dozen freelancers and contractors, and about 30 volunteers—now called the Amplifier Corps—with the hope to recruit dozens more.

== Current Programming ==
Locally produced Rise When The Rooster Crows, once a daily morning feature, now airs traditional Bluegrass music on Sunday mornings. The program moved to weekends when the station added Morning Edition from NPR, which has aired on WYSO since the late 1980s. Bluegrass music is also aired on Saturday evenings with the program "Down Home Bluegrass." The station carries programming from NPR, Public Radio International and BBC World Service, and the locally produced Book Nook, hosted by Vick Mickunas featuring interviews with authors. A segment where William Felker reads his 'Poor Will's Almanack' was carried since 1995; however, the then-85-year-old Felker retired from the broadcast version on April 1, 2025, although a print version was to continue in other media.

In early 2021 the station began a push to strengthen the music programming at WYSO, to fill the hole created locally with the termination of 89.7 WNKU's signal in 2017. Among the station’s 18 local music programs (as of June 2024) are “The Outside” (an experimental and contemporary music show), “Louisiana Byways”, and "Down Home Bluegrass".

WYSO runs the Eichelberger Center for Community Voices, which focuses on teaching audio storytellers from around the Miami Valley the arts of audio production and digital storytelling.

== Current Management ==
Most local programming, as measured by airtime, is produced by volunteers. Volunteers, listeners and donors to the station have asserted an unofficial role in station governance since the 1970s when the station was managed under Antioch's Community Government. As a self-owned station, WYSO maintains that tradition with both a Governing Board for Miami Valley Public Media as well as a Community Advisory Board.

In December 2008, WYSO announced that Neenah Ellis, a public radio producer and host would be the station's next general manager. She and her husband, NPR host and author Noah Adams, made their home in Yellow Springs. By late 2019, Neenah Ellis was President of WYSO-owner Miami Valley Public Media, Inc., and Luke Dennis, aka Lucas Dennis, was General Manager of the station.

As of mid-2024, Will Davis leads the Eichelberger Center.
