= South School (Yellow Springs, Ohio) =

- U.S. National Register of Historic Places
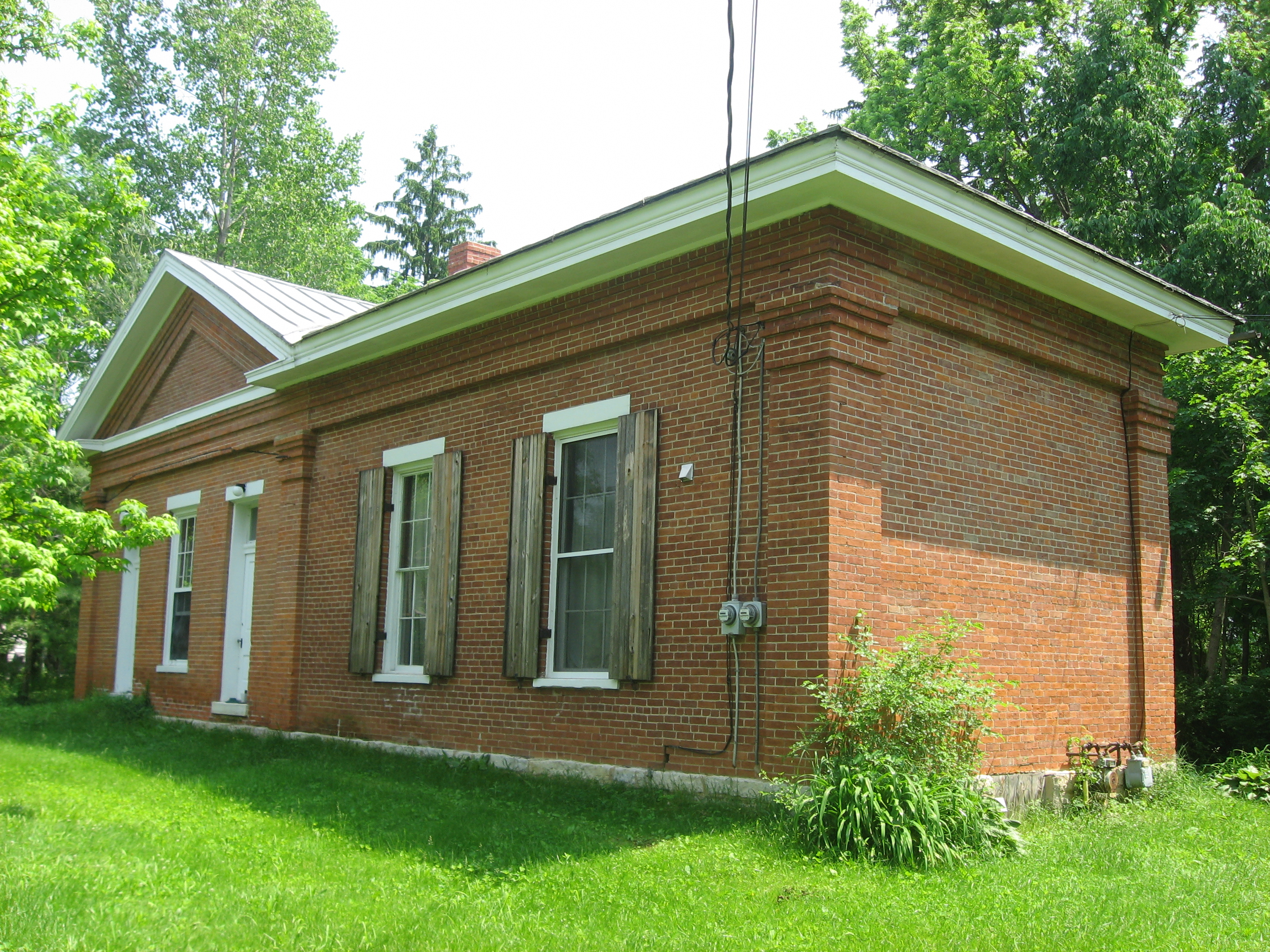
- Front and western side of the school

- Location within Ohio Location within the United States
- Location: 909 S. High St., Yellow Springs, Ohio
- Coordinates: 39°47′55″N 83°53′45″W
- Area: Less than 1 acre (0.40 ha)
- Built: 1856
- Architectural style: Greek Revival
- NRHP reference No.: 89001459
- Added to NRHP: October 4, 1989

The South School is a historic school building in the village of Yellow Springs, Ohio, United States. Over its history of more than 150 years, it has served a wide range of purposes, although it is not used now as a school.

Upon its completion in 1856, the South School served one of the school districts of Miami Township. At that time, small schoolhouses covered Greene County; more than a hundred were still in existence into the late twentieth century. This position it held only for a short time; just two years after its completion, it was converted for use as Yellow Springs High School; at that time, only white students were permitted to attend. After fourteen years in the South School, the high school moved to a different property; from 1872 until 1874, no school typically met on the property. It was reopened in the latter year to serve as the black school, which purpose it served until 1887. Since its closure as a school, it has been converted into apartments.

Architecturally, the South School is a distinctive example of the Greek Revival style of architecture. Constructed on a limestone foundation, it is built of brick and covered with a metal roof. Among its most distinctive elements is the decorative brickwork that appears at certain points on the exterior; such styling is common on buildings constructed during Yellow Springs' golden age in the mid-19th century, but is a stark difference from the county's other historic school buildings. Architectural historians have seen the brickwork as an indication that the school was constructed by local brickmaker and contractor J.W. Hamilton, who established his business in the community in 1848 and was an active part of the community for over thirty years.

In 1984, the South School was listed on the National Register of Historic Places because of its important architecture and because of its place in local history. Key to its place in local history is its use as a segregated school by two races.
