= Alice Griffith Carr =

American nurse

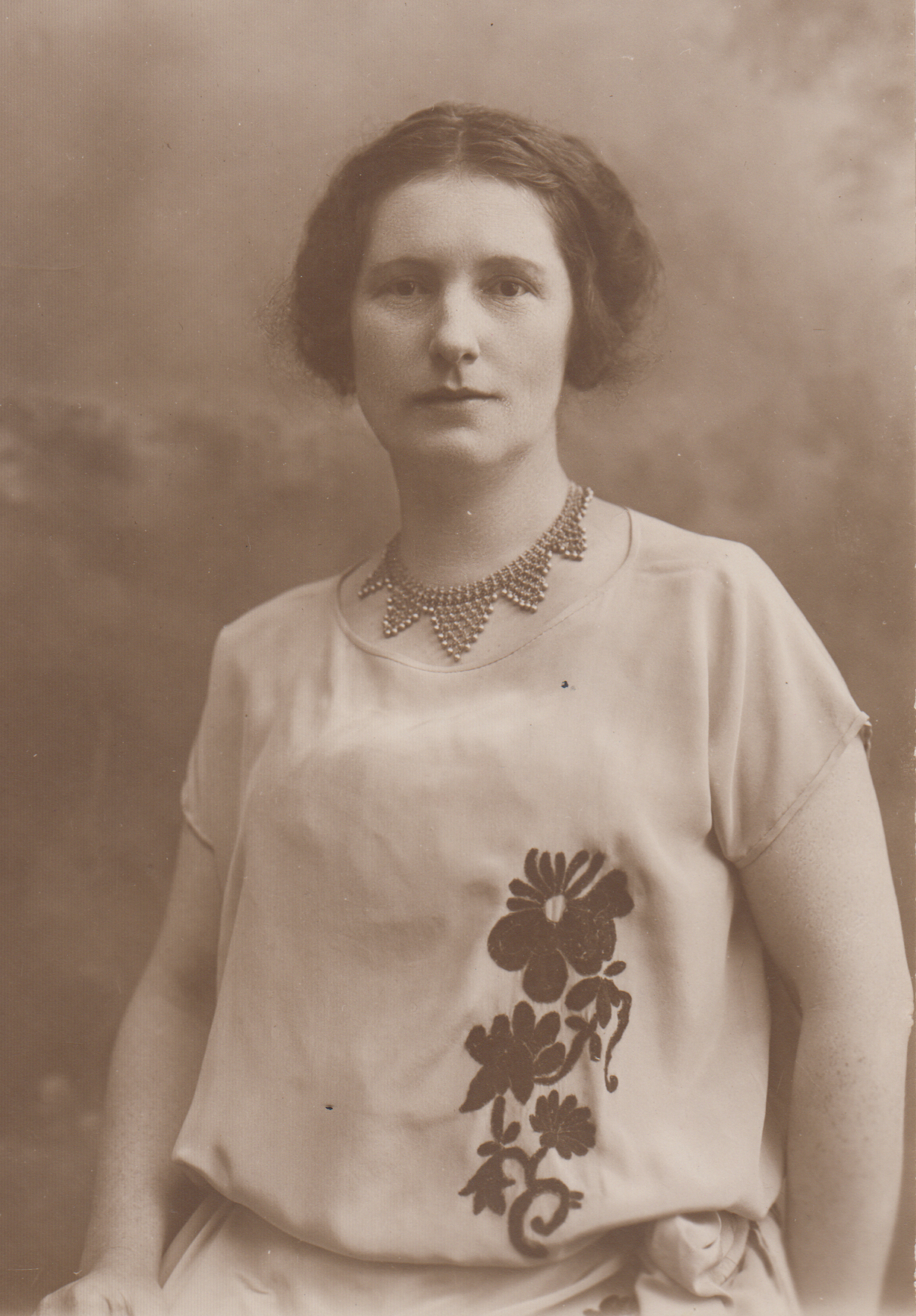
- Alice Griffith Carr in Cairo in 1924
- Born: January 6, 1887; Yellow Springs, Ohio, U.S.
- Died: July 8, 1968 (aged 81); Melbourne Village, Florida, U.S.
- Occupation(s): Nurse, relief worker, public health advisor

Alice Griffith Carr (January 6, 1887 – July 8, 1968) was an American nurse and relief worker. She worked with the American Red Cross and the Near East Foundation to support refugees in Greece after World War I.

== Early life and education ==
Carr was born in Yellow Springs, Ohio, the daughter of Wallace William Carr and Mary Ladley Carr. She graduated from Antioch College in 1904, and completed her nursing training at Johns Hopkins Training School for Nurses in 1914. Later in life, Ohio State University and Antioch College both awarded her honorary doctorates.

== Career ==
Between college and nursing school, Carr taught school and worked as a beautician. In 1917, she went to France with the American Red Cross, and worked in a hospital at Verdun for two years during World War I. After the war, the Red Cross assigned her to work in Poland, Lithuania, Serbia, Smyrna, Czechoslovakia, and Syria. "My war experience left me in a state of high tension," she explained in 1936. "I didn't feel suited for peaceful life again."

Car joined the Near East Foundation's work in Greece in 1923, and soon became the foundation's Director of Public Health in Greece. She opened clinics, organized public health and institutional measures to combat typhus, malaria, dengue fever, and tuberculosis, and worked on prevention, health education, child welfare, nutrition and sanitation projects.

Carr was awarded the Silver Order of St. George and the Silver Cross of the Order of the Phoenix by the Greek government in 1934, and a gold medal from the Greek Department of Health. She also received the Inter-Balkan Grand Prize in 1934.

Carr and other Americans had to leave Greece in 1941, during World War II. "It is hopeless now. There is no food, no medicines, nothing—and no way to get any," she told reporters in Lisbon. She continued her work from New York City, as public health advisor to the Near East Foundation. She lectured on the foundation's work in Greece during the 1940s, and encouraged young women to follow her example: "If it's adventure you want, if you want to have an active career in the great period of reconstruction that will follow the destruction of this war, study nursing."

== Personal life ==
Carr retired to Florida in 1948. She died in 1968, at the age of 81, in Melbourne Village, Florida. Wright State University in Ohio has a large collection of Carr's papers, including correspondence and photographs.
