= Antioch Hall, North and South Halls =

- Antioch Hall, North And South Halls
- U.S. National Register of Historic Places
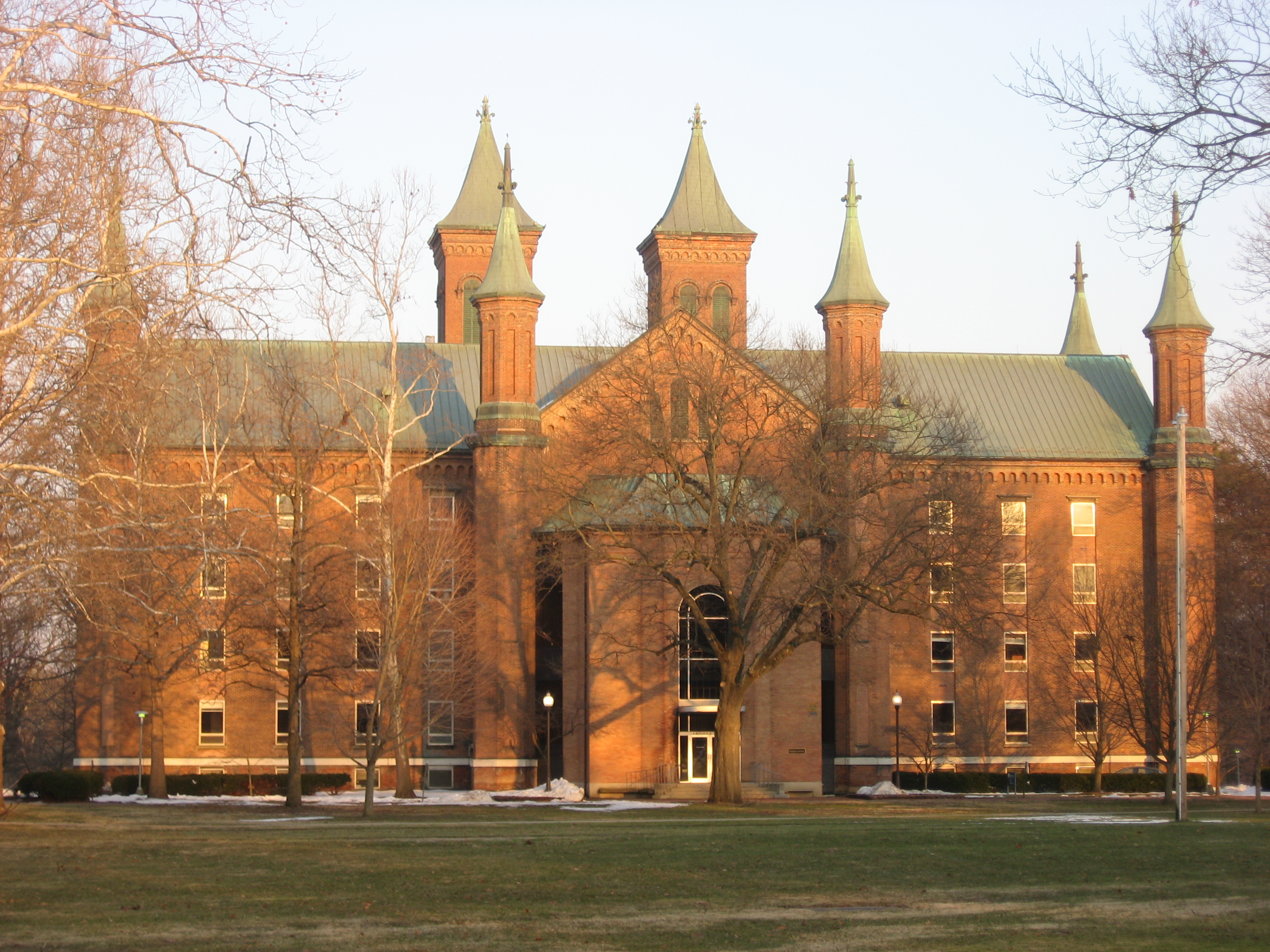
- Rear of Antioch Hall

- Location within Ohio Location within the United States
- Location: Hyde Rd., Antioch College campus, Yellow Springs, Ohio
- Coordinates: 39°47′59″N 83°53′17″W
- Area: 3 acres (1.2 ha)
- Built: 1852
- Built by: Alpheus M. Merrifield
- Architect: Boyden & Ball
- Architectural style: Romanesque Revival
- NRHP reference No.: 75001411
- Added to NRHP: June 30, 1975

Antioch Hall, North and South Halls are a group of historic buildings on the campus of Antioch College in Yellow Springs, Ohio, United States. They were the college's three original buildings, and were listed together on the National Register of Historic Places listings in Greene County, Ohio in 1975.

== History ==
=== Antioch Hall ===
Antioch Hall (known to Antiochians as Main Building) was designed by architect Elbridge Boyden and constructed in the 1852–53 timeframe by Alpheus Marshall Merrifield. It combines elements of Romanesque, Greek Revival and Gothic architectural styles, the latter being most noticeable in its towers. The building was inspired by the Smithsonian Castle in Washington, D.C.

It underwent a massive renovation from 1958 to 1962. This included the inset of a concrete structure inside the original building which stabilized it and insulated its interior against weather and degradation. The renovation also created four floors, instead of the previous three, and relocated its entrance from the east side to the west side. Kelly Hall, a 35-foot-high area between the second and third floors which had earlier been converted from a chapel to become multipurpose event space useful as a gym and an auditorium, was expanded in the renovation to include a balcony, increasing its capacity to over 670 people.

Antioch Hall was closed along with the College in June 2008; however, while the College reopened, Antioch Hall did not. Since the campus's central Power Plant usually provided steam heating to this building and others, and because the Power Plant went offline with the general closure in 2008, Antioch Hall lacked heating which in turn led to plumbing failures and flooding in February 2009. Some restoration was done, the largest from a $500,000 directed grant from Yellow Springs Community Foundation in 2019, intended to tackle projects of immediate need such as reintroducing heating. However, considerable additional funding was estimated to be needed to bring the building back to usefulness, with numbers ranging from $7.5 million to $20 million.

Restoration of the building in phases was announced in March of 2026. Per the plan, Phase 1 would open part of the building for use; Phase 2 would open the 670-seat Kelly Hall auditorium; and Phase 3 would see the building’s towers opened. As of September 2026, the building’s first floor was officially available for occupancy, and fundraising was continuing for the upper three floors including Kelly Hall.

=== North Hall ===
North Hall is an operational residence hall. Its first residents were the entering class of 1853. In 1953 it was extensively reconstructed following a significant fire in February of that year, with use of an interior steel framework supporting four-inch reinforced concrete floors which made the building more fireproof. In 2011 it underwent a $5.7 million renovation effort to combine both comfortable and sustainable living, and reopened in 2012. The renovation project achieved a LEED energy-efficiency Gold Level Certification on July 26, 2013, and was the oldest building in the country to obtain such a rating, taking the title from the U.S. Treasury Building. The project included solar panels on the building’s roof, and twenty-five 600'-deep geothermal wells for heating and cooling.

=== South Hall ===
South Hall also opened in 1853, as the college’s men’s dormitory. Renovated in 1994, it too was damaged after closure in 2008 when a sprinkler system pipe on the fourth floor of the unheated building burst in December of that year, flooding the structure’s east end. However, contractors and volunteers pushed through a cleanup effort to dry it out. It reopened after some exterior renovations in January 2010. It is the location of college offices, as well as Herndon Gallery, which is used for exhibitions and academic conferences.

== See also ==
- Horace Mann
