= Yellow Springs, Ohio =

- Village
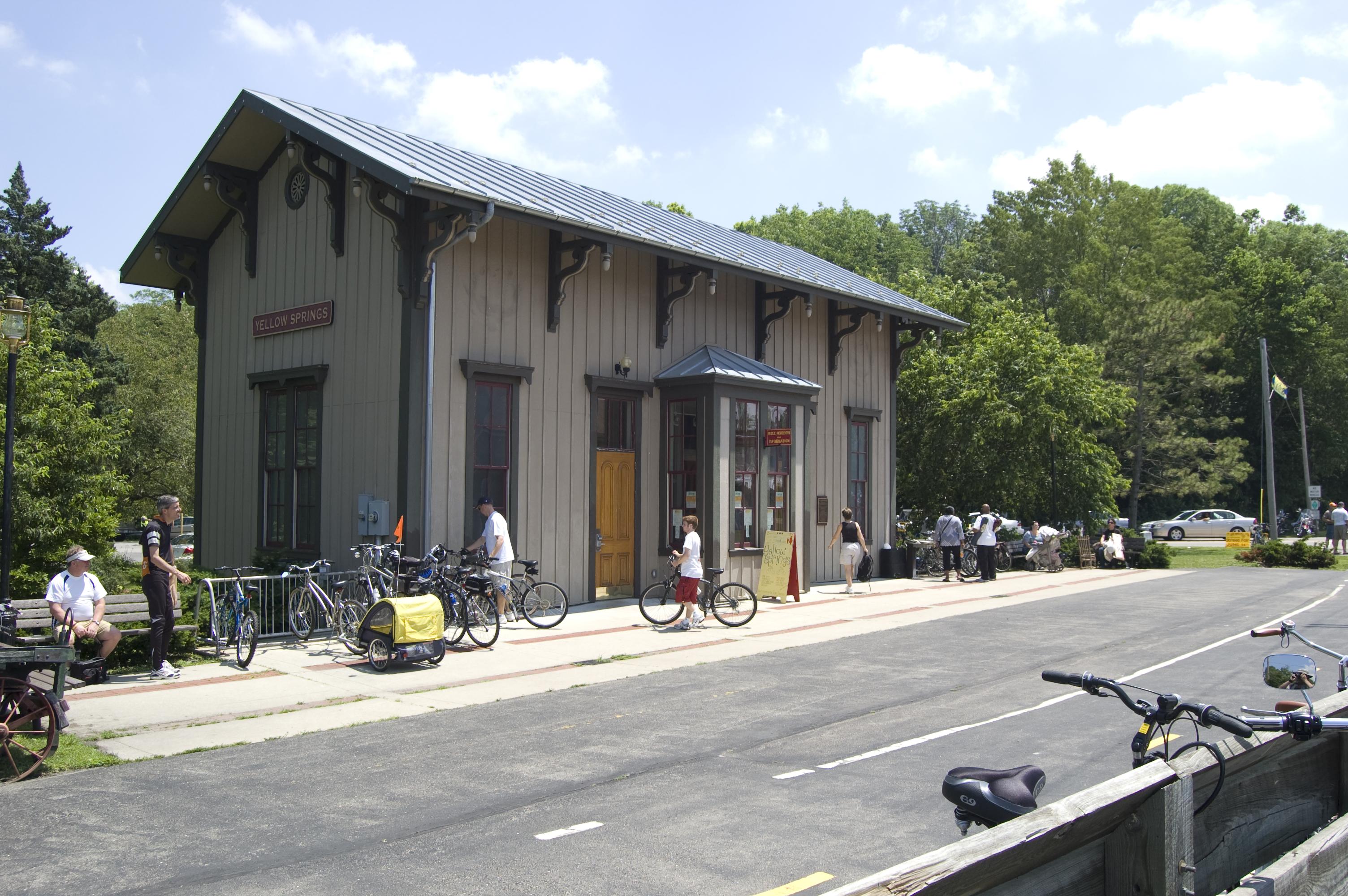
- Former railroad station
- Motto: Find Yourself Here
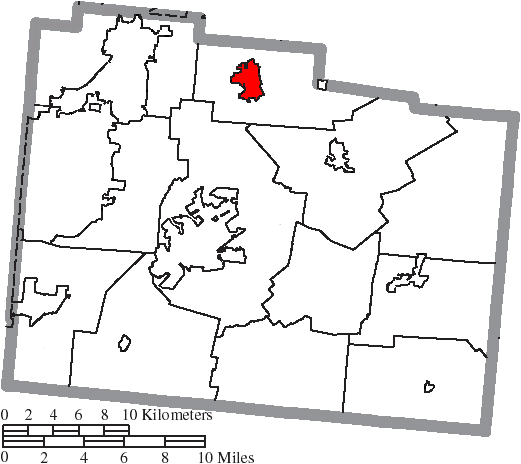
- Location of Yellow Springs in Greene County

- Location within Ohio Location within the United States
- Coordinates: 39°47′30″N 83°52′43″W
- Country: United States
- State: Ohio
- County: Greene
- Established: 1825

Area
  - Total: 2.75 sq mi (7.13 km^{2})
  - Land: 2.75 sq mi (7.13 km^{2})
  - Water: 0 sq mi (0.00 km^{2})
- Elevation: 1,020 ft (310 m)

Population (2020)
  - Total: 3,697
  - Density: 1,343.5/sq mi (518.73/km^{2})
- Time zone: UTC-5 (Eastern (EST))
  - Summer (DST): UTC-4 (EDT)
- ZIP code: 45387
- Area codes: 937, 326
- FIPS code: 39-86940
- GNIS feature ID: 2399752
- Website: yellowsprings.gov

Yellow Springs is a village in northern Greene County, Ohio, United States. The population was 3,697 at the 2020 census. It is part of the Dayton metropolitan area and is home to Antioch College.

== History ==
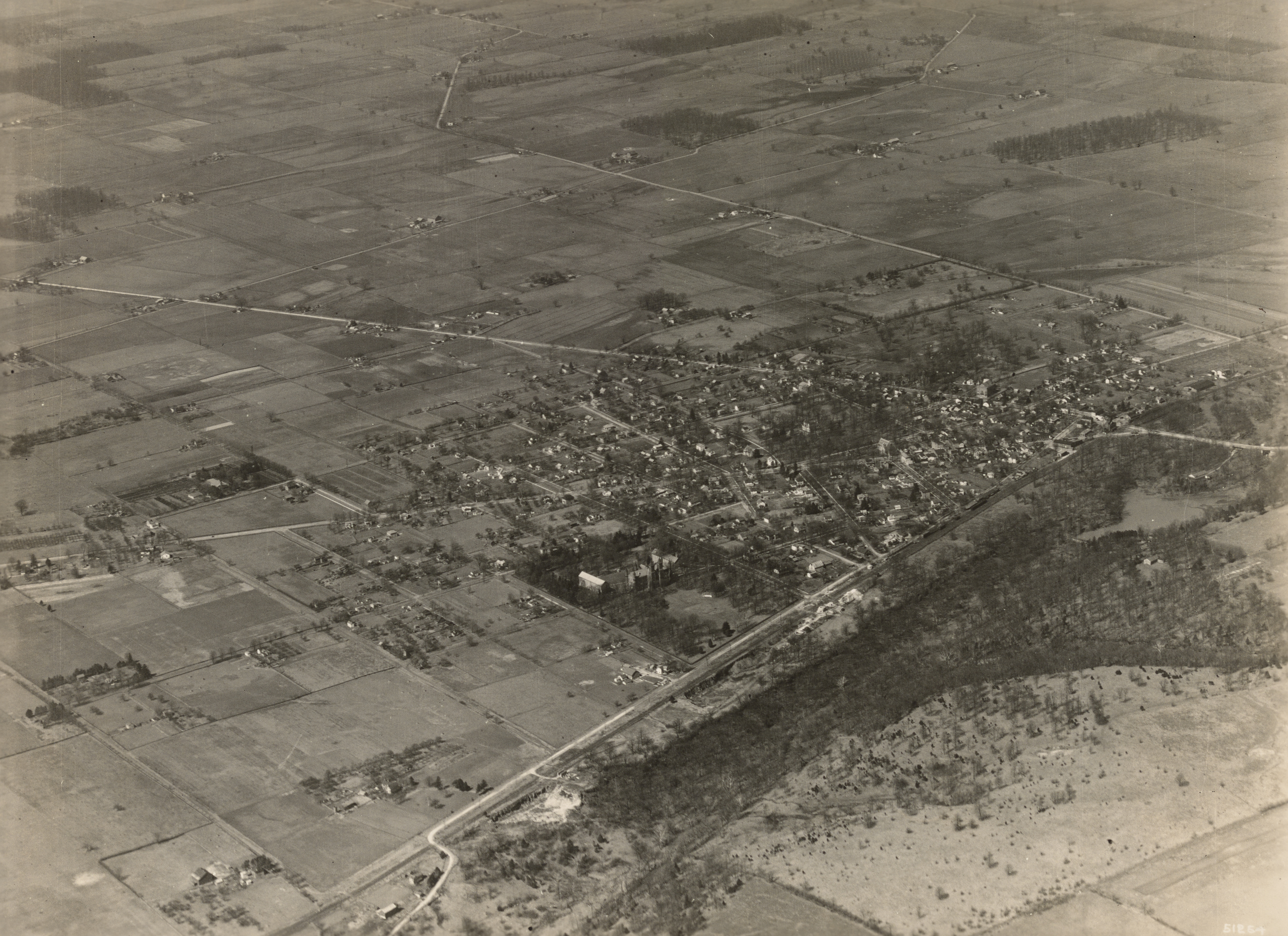
Yellow Springs in 1937

In 1825, the village was founded by William Mills and approximately 100 families, followers of Robert Owen, who wanted to emulate the utopian community at New Harmony, Indiana. The village was named after nearby natural springs with waters high in iron content. The communitarian efforts dissolved due to internal conflicts.

The completion of the Little Miami Railroad in 1846 brought increased commerce, inhabitants, and tourism to this area of Greene County. Many regular visitors of the 19th century came for the springs, as these were believed to have medicinal benefits. The village of Yellow Springs was incorporated in 1856.

=== Antioch College ===
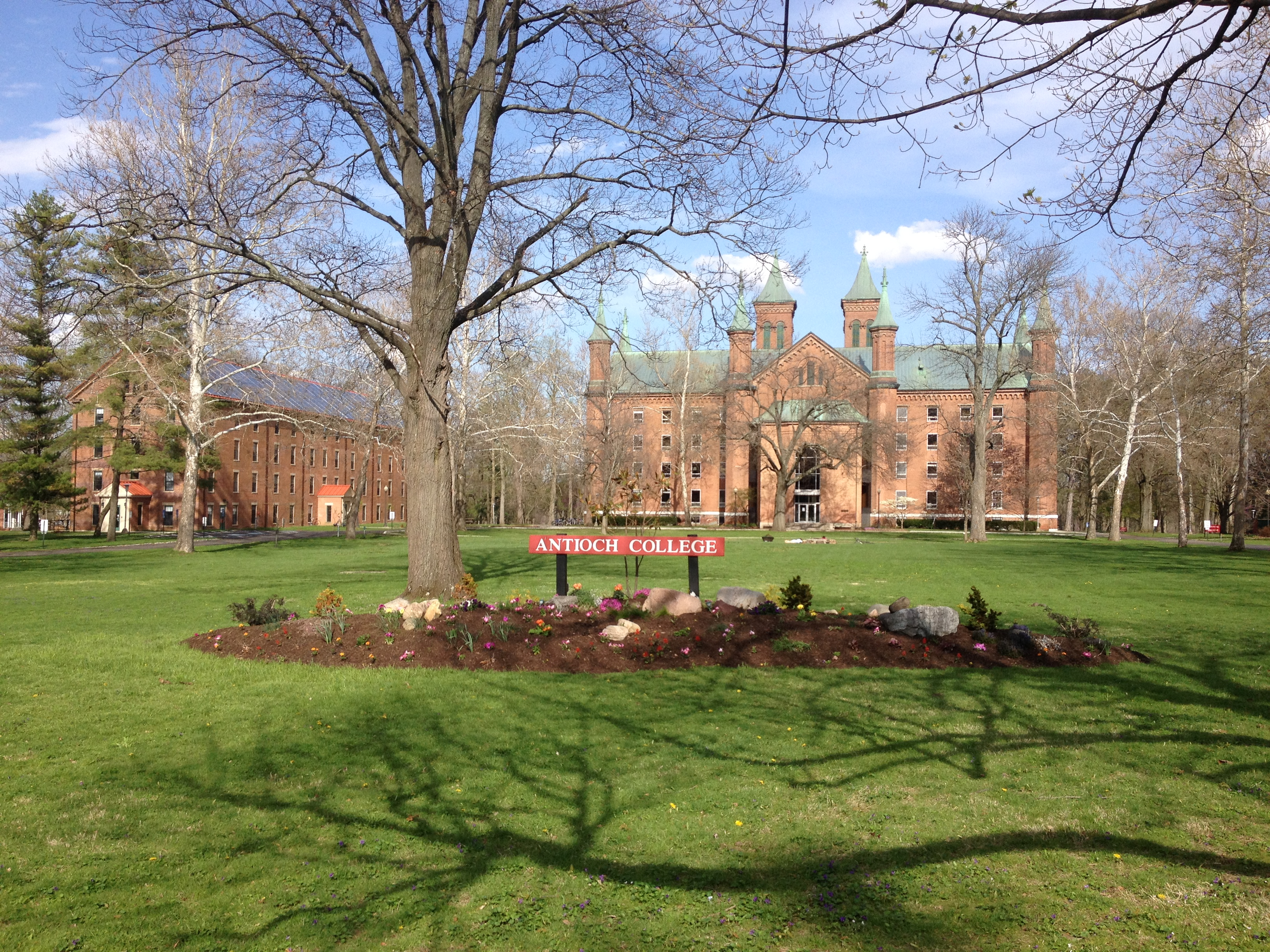
The campus grounds of Antioch College

Antioch College was founded in 1850 by the Christian Connection, and began operating in 1853 with the distinguished scholar Horace Mann as its first president.

In 1920, Arthur E. Morgan became president of Antioch College; he was known for his innovations and implemented a much-imitated work-study program for students. An engineer by training, Morgan left Antioch to become head of the Tennessee Valley Authority during President Franklin D. Roosevelt's administration. Upon his return to Yellow Springs, Morgan was a key leader of Quaker intentional community developments in Ohio and North Carolina.

In 1926, the Antioch Company was founded by two then-current Antioch College students as "The Antioch Bookplate Company". The company expanded to selling children's books, gifts, and craft products, In 2008, the company sold off its Antioch Publishing business, and focused the remaining business on the company's Creative Memories brand of custom framing and scrapbooking items. The remaining Yellow Spring facility of Creative Memories closed in 2012.

Antioch College expanded beginning in 1964, to include 38 "centers" around the country by the end of 1979. Its by-laws were changed to define Antioch as a "network", not a college, owned by Antioch University Corporation. In 1986, 32 of its units around the country were closed, leaving six campuses, which included both its original College campus in Yellow Springs and the college's School of Adult and Experiential Learning there. It operated separately as Antioch University McGregor. That adult and graduate education school was renamed as Antioch University Midwest in 1988. It closed in late 2020.

In 2008, citing financial exigency, the university closed the college campus in Yellow Springs. College alumni, forming the Antioch College Continuation Corporation, bought back the college's name and campus. They reopened in 2011 as the independent Antioch College.

Since 2009, Antioch University and Antioch College have been wholly separate institutions.

=== Freed slaves ===
The Conway Colony, a group of 30 freed slaves who were transported by Moncure D. Conway, the abolitionist son of their former owner, were settled in this village in 1862.

Wheeling Gaunt, a former slave who had purchased his own freedom, came to Yellow Springs in the 1860s. By his death in 1894, he owned a substantial amount of land. Gaunt bequeathed to the village a large piece of land on its western side, requesting that the rent be used to buy flour for the "poor and worthy widows" of Yellow Springs. Although the land was used to create Gaunt Park, and thus does not generate rent, the village expanded the bequest to include sugar. It still delivers flour and sugar to the village's widows at Christmas time, a tradition that generates annual media coverage.

=== Activism ===
During the Red Scare of the 1950s, Yellow Springs and Antioch College came under scrutiny for alleged sympathies of faculty and students to the Communist Party, due to many locals' support of left-wing politics. After being questioned by the Ohio House Un-American Activities Committee, Antioch president Douglas McGregor released a statement in 1952 that "Antioch upholds the American tradition of academic freedom. This means the right to hear and investigate all sides of any question, including the question of Russia and Communism".

By the late 1960s and early 1970s, the village became a center of activity for the Civil Rights Movement and anti-war movement in southwestern Ohio. Villagers have retained a progressive cast in their politics, attracting new residents with similar ideas and establishing a unique sociopolitical demographic element in a primarily conservative region of the state.

In 1979, Yellow Springs held the distinction of being the smallest municipality to pass an ordinance prohibiting discrimination based on sexual orientation. As of 2014, it had the largest LGBT population of all Ohio's villages.

== Geography ==
According to the United States Census Bureau, the village has a total area of 2.02 square miles (5.23 km^{2}), all land.

The village takes its name from a nearby natural spring whose waters are rich in iron, leaving a yellowish-orange coloring on the rocks. Now included within the nearby Glen Helen Nature Preserve, in the mid-19th century, it became the center of a resort. During this period, many individuals traveled to areas of such springs, believing the waters had medicinal benefits.

== Government ==
The village of Yellow Springs has a Mayor/Council/ form of government with a Mayor's Court that is in session two times a month. The council appoints a village manager.

== Demographics ==
Historical population
Census	Pop.	Note	%±
1850	138		—
1860	1,319		855.8%
1870	1,435		8.8%
1880	1,377		−4.0%
1890	1,375		−0.1%
1900	1,371		−0.3%
1910	1,360		−0.8%
1920	1,264		−7.1%
1930	1,427		12.9%
1940	1,640		14.9%
1950	2,896		76.6%
1960	4,167		43.9%
1970	4,624		11.0%
1980	4,077		−11.8%
1990	3,973		−2.6%
2000	3,761		−5.3%
2010	3,487		−7.3%
2020	3,697		6.0%
U.S. Decennial Census

=== Racial demographics ===
Affordable housing and diversity in job hiring attracted African Americans to Yellow Springs in the 1950s-1970s.

In 1970, 27% of the population was African American. 72% of the population was white. In 2000, the population was 15% African American, 76.6% white, and 5.7% two or more races. In 2020, the population was 9.1% African American, 78.6% white, and 9.0% two or more races.

=== 2020 census ===
As of the 2020 census, Yellow Springs had a population of 3,697. The median age was 50.7 years. 16.8% of residents were under the age of 18 and 30.6% of residents were 65 years of age or older. For every 100 females there were 82.8 males, and for every 100 females age 18 and over there were 79.4 males age 18 and over.

0.0% of residents lived in urban areas, while 100.0% lived in rural areas.

There were 1,806 households in Yellow Springs, of which 21.4% had children under the age of 18 living in them. Of all households, 37.3% were married-couple households, 19.7% were households with a male householder and no spouse or partner present, and 36.9% were households with a female householder and no spouse or partner present. About 40.6% of all households were made up of individuals and 21.9% had someone living alone who was 65 years of age or older.

There were 1,926 housing units, of which 6.2% were vacant. The homeowner vacancy rate was 1.0% and the rental vacancy rate was 4.2%.

Racial composition as of the 2020 census
Race	Number	Percent
White	2,904	78.6%
Black or African American	336	9.1%
American Indian and Alaska Native	25	0.7%
Asian	45	1.2%
Native Hawaiian and Other Pacific Islander	4	0.1%
Some other race	50	1.4%
Two or more races	333	9.0%
Hispanic or Latino (of any race)	174	4.7%

=== 2010 census ===
As of the census of 2010, there were 3,487 people, 1,672 households, and 902 families living in the village. The population density was 1,726.2 inhabitants per square mile (666.5/km^{2}). There were 1,805 dwelling units at an average density of 893.6 per square mile (345.0/km^{2}). The racial makeup of the village was 78.1% White, 12.0% African American, 0.6% Native American, 1.5% Asian, 0.4% from other races, and 7.3% from two or more races. Hispanic or Latino of any race were 2.0% of the population.

There were 1,672 households, of which 25.4% had children under the age of 18 living with them, 37.4% were married couples living together, 13.5% had a female householder with no husband present, 3.1% had a male householder with no wife present, and 46.1% were non-families. 39.2% of all households were made up of individuals, and 15.4% had someone living alone who was 65 years of age or older. The average household size was 2.04 and the average family size was 2.70.

The median age in the village was 48.5 years. 19.7% of residents were under the age of 18; 5.1% were between the ages of 18 and 24; 20.6% were from 25 to 44; 33.1% were from 45 to 64; and 21.6% were 65 years of age or older. The gender makeup of the village was 46.0% male and 54.0% female.

=== Income and poverty ===
According to the US Census Bureau's 2006–2010 American Community Survey, the median income for a household in the village was $56,000 and the median income for a family was $71,379. Males had a median income of $52,208 versus $52,019 for females. The per capita income for the village was $32,886. About 6.7% of families and 15.1% of the population were below the poverty line, including 12.0% of those under age 18 and 10.1% of those age 65 or over.

== Arts and culture ==
National Register of Historic Places listings in Yellow Springs include Antioch Hall, North and South Halls, South School, and the Yellow Springs Historic District. Young's Jersey Dairy is a family-operated dairy farm and restaurant several visitor attractions outside the scope of a typical dairy farm, including batting cages, miniature golf, and a petting zoo.

Relative to its size, Yellow Springs has a large arts community. Local organizations include:

- Yellow Springs Arts Council
- Yellow Springs Theater Company
- Yellow Springs Kids Playhouse (now folded)
- Chamber Music Yellow Springs (CMYS)
- The World House Choir
- The Yellow Springs Community Chorus
- The Yellow Springs Chamber Orchestra
- The Yellow Springs Community Band (YSCB)
- Yellow Springs Strings (Senior Orchestra)

== Parks and recreation ==
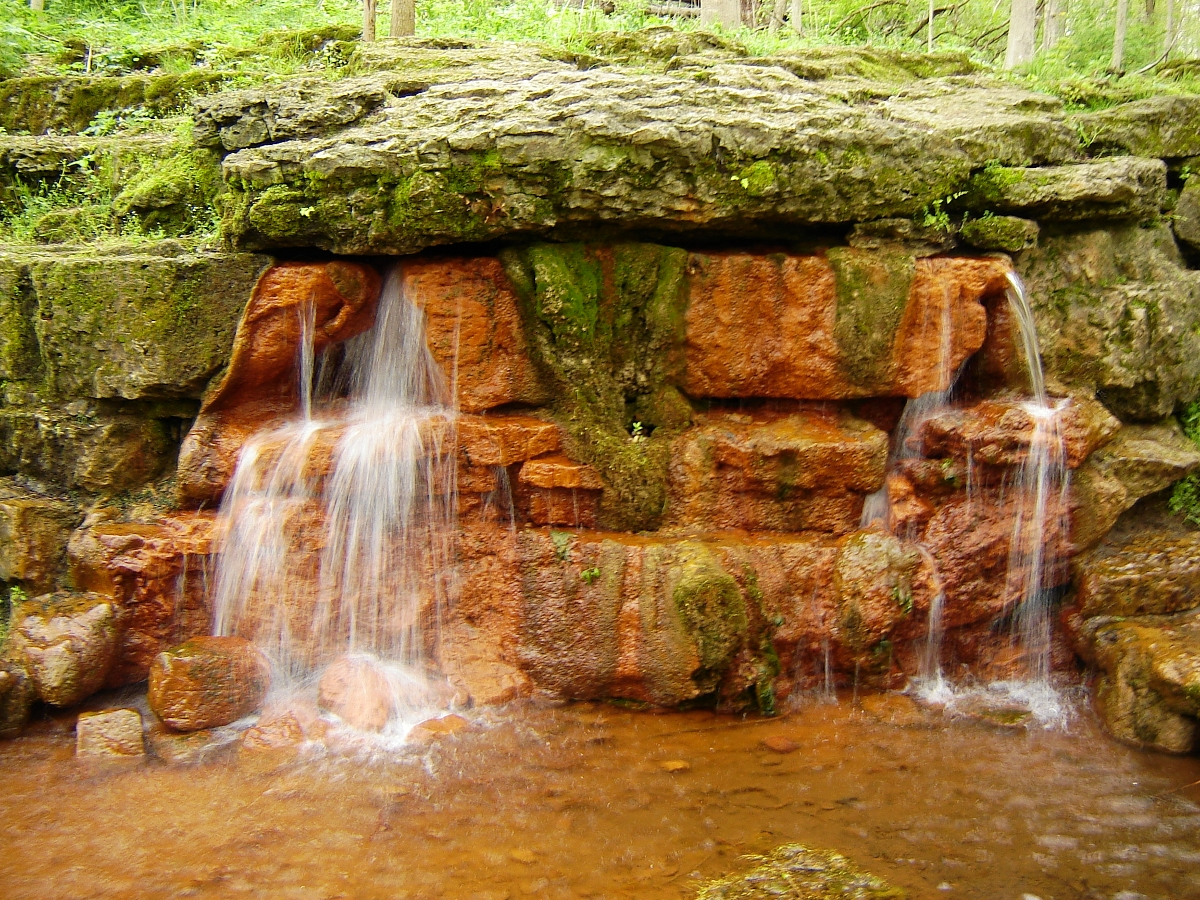
Yellow Springs in the Glen Helen Nature Preserve

Yellow Springs is home to or near numerous parks, including the Glen Helen Nature Preserve, Little Miami Bike Trail, John Bryan State Park, and Clifton Gorge State Nature Preserve. Various parks are owned by the Village of Yellow Springs and run through its Parks and Recreation department. The Village's largest park is Gaunt Park, which has two baseball diamonds and a pool. Just north of the Village is Ellis Park, which has a picnic area and a pond. Several additional neighborhood park areas are scattered through the village.

== Education ==
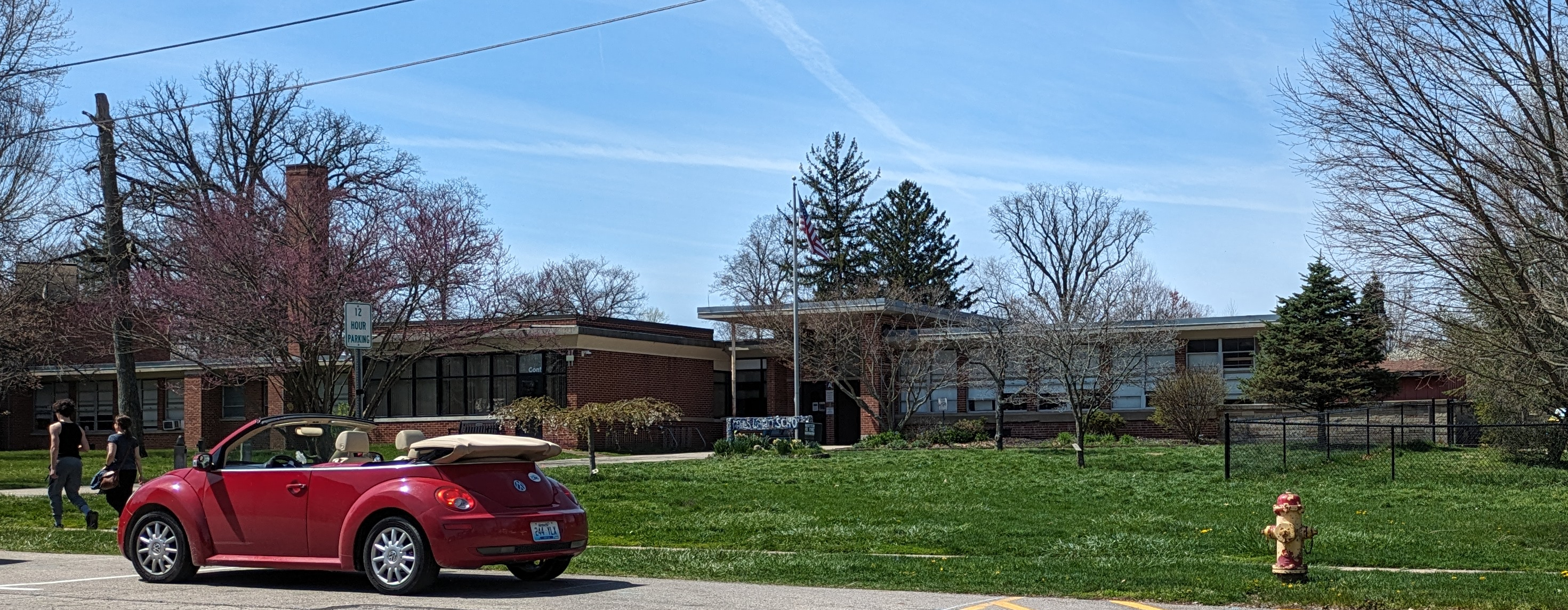
Mills Lawn Elementary School

Yellow Springs Exempted Village School District operates three schools in the village: Mills Lawn Elementary, McKinney Middle School, and Yellow Springs High School.

The only private elementary school in Yellow Springs is the Antioch School, a democratic school for students in preschool through sixth grade. It was founded by Arthur Ernest Morgan as a laboratory school of Antioch College.

Antioch College, a private liberal arts college, was founded at Yellow Springs in 1850. The city was also home to Antioch University Midwest, part of the Antioch University network, until 2020. Its functions were absorbed into Antioch University's online division, and its building put up for sale. However, Antioch University's administration, as well as its online division and Graduate School of Leadership & Change, remain headquartered in Yellow Springs.

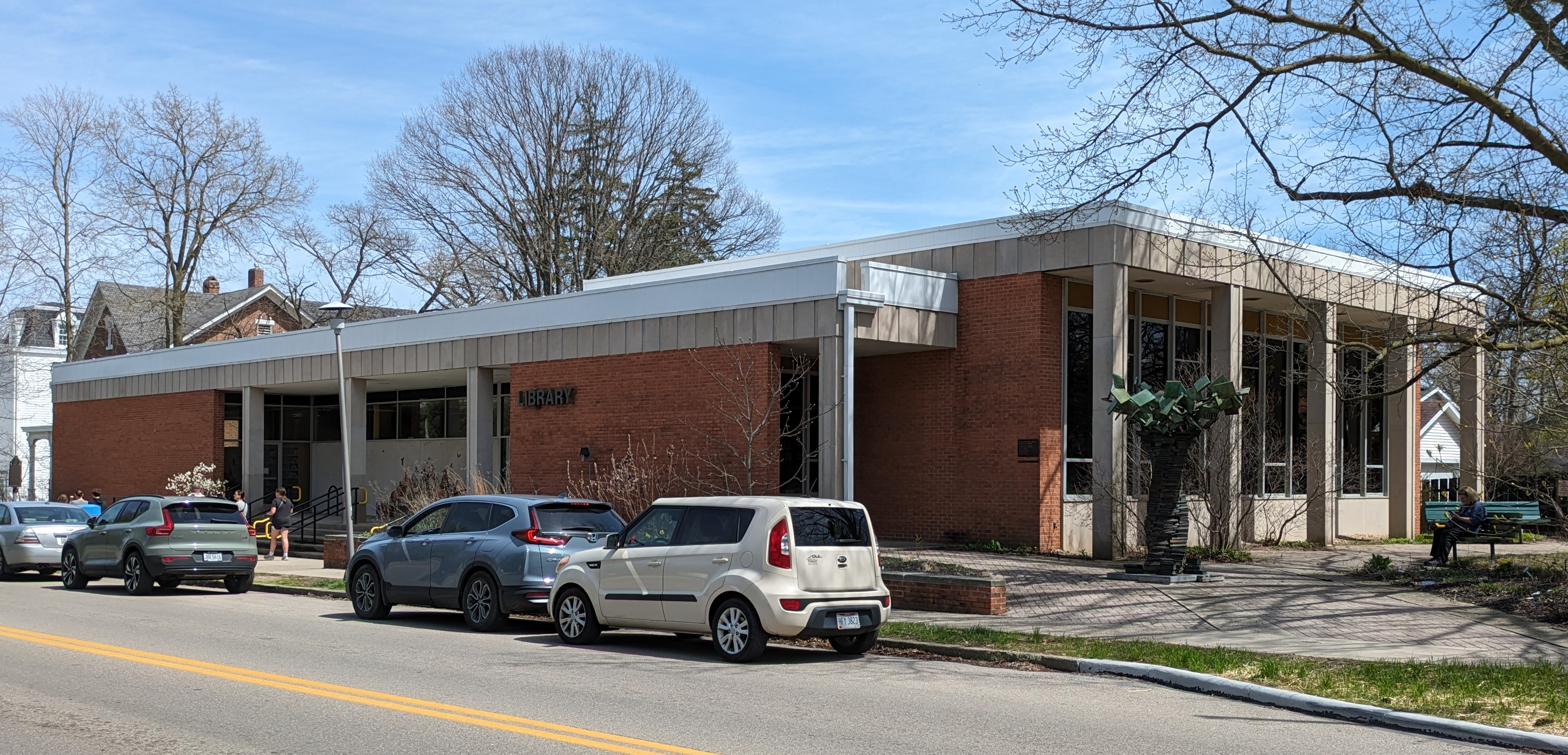
Yellow Springs Community Library

Yellow Springs has a public library, a branch of the Greene County Public Library.

== Media ==
Yellow Springs is the home of public radio station WYSO, which is a member station of National Public Radio and was licensed to the Board of Trustees of Antioch College until WYSO became independently owned and operated in 2019. The station continues in collaboration with the college, such as by working with college students as interns.

Local news and events are covered by an independent weekly newspaper, the Yellow Springs News.

== Notable people ==
- Paul Abels, clergyman
- Noah Adams, public radio journalist and author
- Arnold Adoff, poet and author
- Roberta Alexander, operatic soprano
- Cindy Blackman, jazz/rock drummer; wife of Carlos Santana
- Alice Griffith Carr, Red Cross nurse in World War I
- Donnell Rawlings, American comedian and actor
- Dave Chappelle, American comedian and actor
- Suzanne Clauser, screenwriter and novelist
- Mike DeWine, former US Senator, former Ohio Attorney General, current 70th Governor of Ohio
- Monica Drake, assistant managing editor, New York Times
- Jewel Freeman Graham, educator, social worker, attorney, and World YWCA president
- Richie Furay, singer, songwriter, and Rock & Roll Hall of Fame member
- Virginia Hamilton, children's author
- Anne Harris, musician and actor
- Jon Barlow Hudson, sculptor
- Mike Kahoe, Major League Baseball player
- Coretta Scott King, civil rights leader and wife of Martin Luther King Jr.
- Kristina Knickerbocker, American politician
- John Lithgow, actor
- Neal Vernon Loving, racing pilot and aeronautical engineer
- Trace Lysette, actress
- Michael Malarkey, actor and musician
- David Nibert, sociologist, author and animal rights activist
- Catherine Roma, choral conductor
- David Wilcox, American folk musician
- Julia Reichert, Documentary filmmaker
