= Yellow Springs News =

- Type: Weekly newspaper
- Format: Broadsheet
- Owner(s): Cheryl Durgans, Lauren Shows and Matt Minde
- Editor: Cheryl Durgans
- Founded: 1880
- Headquarters: 253-1/2 Xenia Ave. Yellow Springs, Ohio
- Circulation: 1,800
- Price: $1.50
- Website: ysnews.com

Yellow Springs News is an independently owned weekly newspaper that serves the community of Yellow Springs, Ohio, United States. It has a weekly circulation of approximately 1,800.

== History ==
Yellow Springs News was founded in 1880. It was purchased by Arthur Morgan in the early 1940s and was briefly a part of the Antioch Bookplate Company.

Today it is co-owned by editor Cheryl Durgans, associate editor Lauren Shows and designer Matt Minde.

== Regular Features ==
Yellow Springs News produces local news and reporting, in-depth, multi-part series on a subject, lists of upcoming events, editorials, guest columns, letters to the editor, classifieds, and obituaries. The back page is often devoted to local sports. Other regular columns include:

- Poor Will's Almanack: a weekly essay written by local resident William Felker, followed by an overview of the week's seasonal markers and astronomical events
- Village Police Report: a summary of the week's police blotter

== Other publications ==
- Repeat Offenders: a paperback compilation of the most humorous or memorable items from the weekly police report.
- Yellow Springs Community Directory: a yearly publication of residential and business listings.
- Guide to Yellow Springs: a periodic supplement that highlights local events, attractions, and businesses.

== Awards ==
The Osman C. Hooper Awards are distributed annually by the Ohio News Media Association (formerly Ohio Newspaper Association). Yellow Springs News won the general excellence award for its division in 1985, 2006, and 2008. In 2009 it won first prize among all member weeklies for its editorial writing. It has been named "Best Newspaper in its Size Class" each year from 2011 through 2022.
