= Indiana Theatre =

Indiana Theatre may refer to either of the following buildings:

- Indiana Theatre (Indianapolis, Indiana), listed on the NRHP in Marion County, Indiana
- Indiana Theatre (Terre Haute, Indiana), listed on the NRHP in Vigo County, Indiana
