= Indiana Theatre (Terre Haute, Indiana) =

- U.S. National Register of Historic Places
- U.S. Historic district – Contributing property
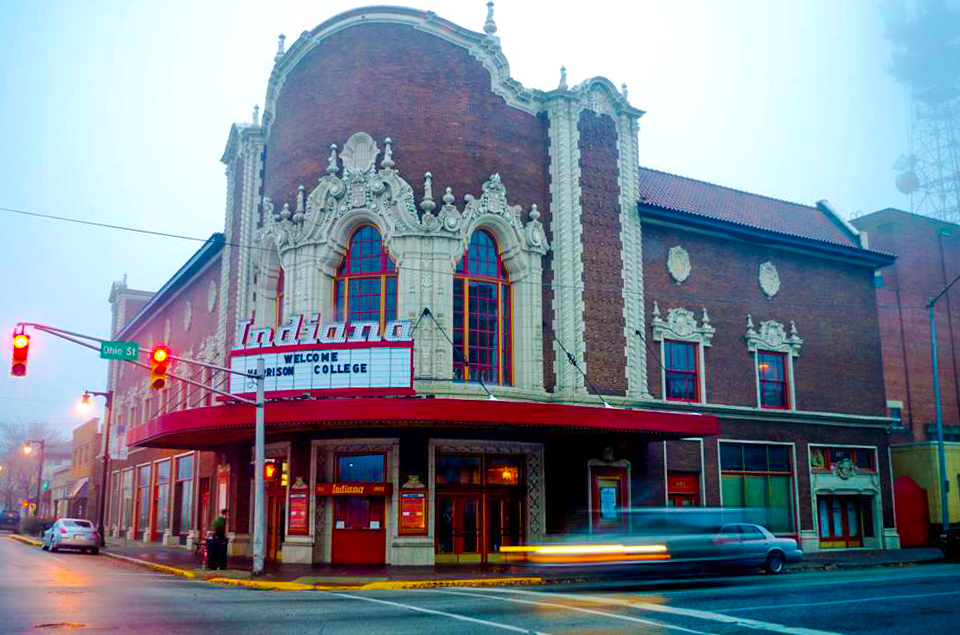
- Indiana Theatre Event Center in Terre Haute, Indiana

- Location within Vigo County, Indiana Location within Indiana Location within the United States
- Location: 683 Ohio St., Terre Haute, Indiana
- Coordinates: 39°27′55″N 87°24′26″W
- Built: 1921; 105 years ago
- Architect: John Eberson
- Architectural style: Spanish Baroque, Atmospheric theater
- MPS: Downtown Terre Haute MRA
- NRHP reference No.: 83004578
- Added to NRHP: November 13, 1997

The Indiana Theatre is a historic theater in Terre Haute, United States. It was added to the National Register of Historic Places on November 13, 1997, and is located in the Wabash Avenue-East Historic District. It opened on January 28, 1922. The theatre was built by Terre Haute resident T. W. Barhydt and was designed by John Eberson. Eberson, who later developed the atmospheric theater style of movie palace, first experimented with atmospheric design elements at the theatre. Eberson stated, "Into this Indiana Theatre I have put my very best efforts and endeavors in the art of designing a modern theatre such as I have often pictured as what I would do were I given a free hand." Through this quote Eberson suggests that the Indiana Theatre embodies the raw beginning of his experiment with a "dream" theater that marked the beginning shift to his atmospheric style.

Throughout its history, the theatre has hosted a wide range of events that have included vaudeville, cinema, performing arts and community celebrations of all types. Long time employees remember nostalgic entertainers such as Frank Sinatra, Red Skelton, Lucille Ball and Desi Arnaz, Jack Burns, and the Marx Brothers Road Shows at the Indiana Theater. The Indiana Theatre was chosen as the site for the world premiere screening of Disney's McFarland, USA on November 20, 2014.

Through restoration efforts which began in May 2013, the Indiana Theatre's heritage has been preserved and the Indiana has been reborn as a 1,600 seat full service event center which can host a wide range of community gatherings that include live entertainment, performing arts, cinema, wedding events, and fundraisers.

== Construction ==
The John Schumacher Company of Indianapolis was the builder and the cost of construction was $1,000,000 in 1922 dollars. Construction consisted of 1,665,000 bricks, 7,250 yards of excavation, 24,500 s.f. of cement floor, and 283 tons of steel. All fabrication and plaster work was prepared onsite and the project design and construction was completed in 18+ months. The theater lighting system was the most modern system in the nation. The Indiana Theatre was originally built for vaudeville and silent movies but was adapted to talking movies as vaudeville faded from prominence. Originally, the building façade featured an enormous peacock which consisted of 3,000 lights and “lit up the corner of 7th and Ohio like nothing ever seen before".

== Opening night ==
On January 27, 1922, dignitaries were invited for a sneak preview of the Theatre. On this night T.W. Barhydt received telegrams from Paramount stars in Hollywood: Bebe Daniels, Gloria Swanson, Rudolph Valentino, Jack Holt, Betty Compton, Wallace Reid, and Adolph Zukor. The Indiana Theatre opened its doors to the public on January 28, 1922. Movie tickets were 25 cents before 6pm and 40 cents after 6pm, a ticket to sit in one of the boxes was 50 cents, and children under 12 were admitted for 10 cents. Theatre staff were dressed for the opening in authentic Spanish attire and live peacocks roamed through the Theatre. A 30-piece orchestra played an overture before the opening silent movie, Cappy Ricks. The first talking movie was shown in the Indiana Theatre on March 13, 1929. The orchestra was directed by Raymond B. Townsley. Old-fashioned songs were sung by Jackson Murray and Marion Mills. A fashion show with clothing from Siegel's department store was part of the opening activities. In addition to the movie Cappy Ricks and the Siegel's fashion show, there were five acts of Broadway vaudeville, short subjects, and a prologue.

== Theodore W. Barhydt ==
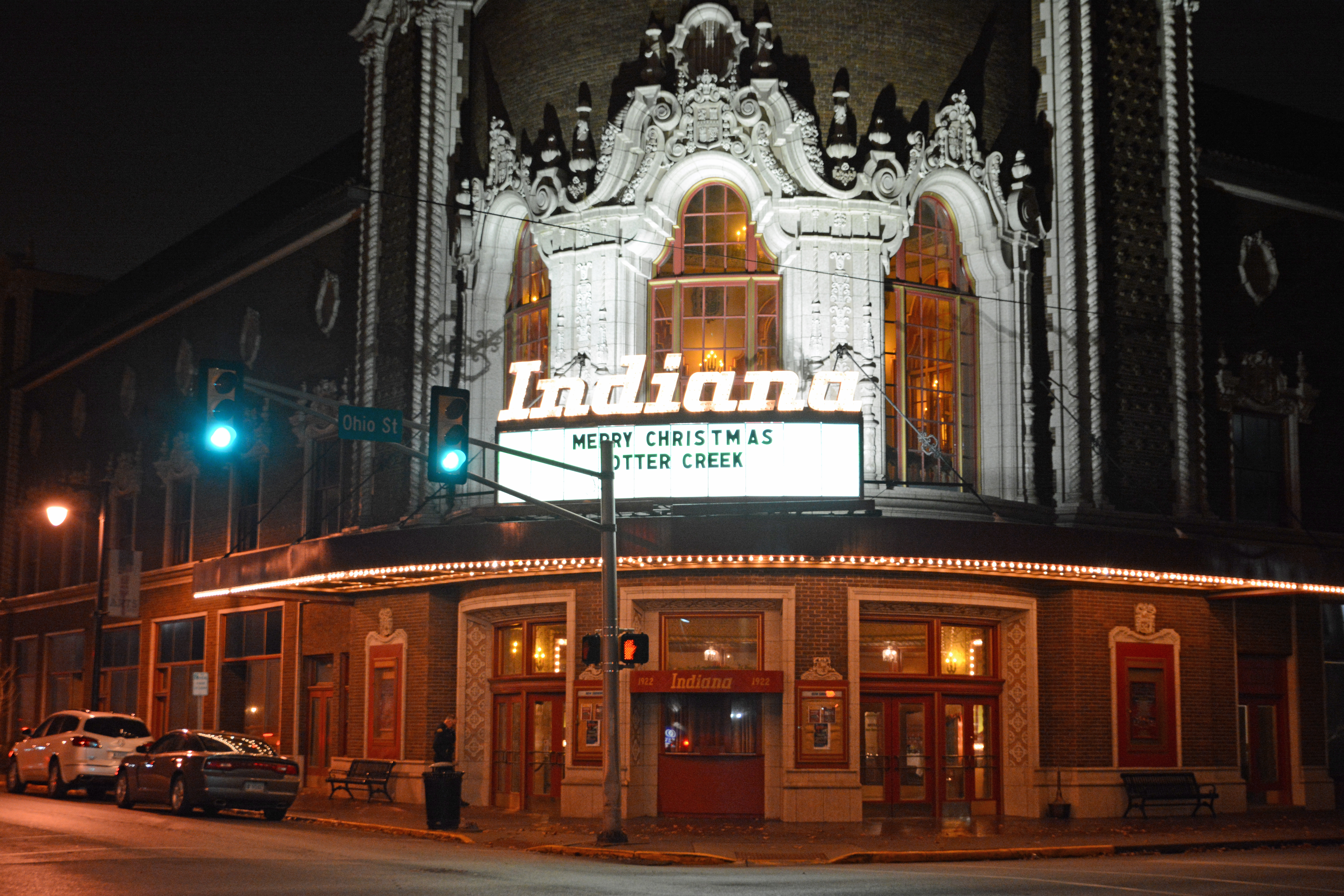
The Indiana Theatre at night

The Founding President of the Indiana Theatre was T.W. Barhydt. Mr. Barhydt was the driving force to build the Indiana Theatre with family roots in Opera, Theatre and Vaudeville. Mr. Barhydt was prominent in Terre Haute business with ties to the Terre Haute House Hotel, Grand Opera House (1897), Varieties Theatre (1907), Hippodrome Theatre (Terre Haute, Indiana) (Scottish Rite Temple 1916), and Indiana Theatre Corporation (Formed 1920). The Hippodrome is the oldest remaining vaudeville theater in America which was built at the cost of $100,000. John Eberson was the architect and designer of the Hippodrome, TW Barhydt's personal residence, and the Indiana Theatre. Mr. Barhydt built the Indiana Theatre as a gift of appreciation to Terre Haute because he wanted to erase the perception of Terre Haute being a “One Street Town” (Wabash Avenue – Highway 40).

== Design ==
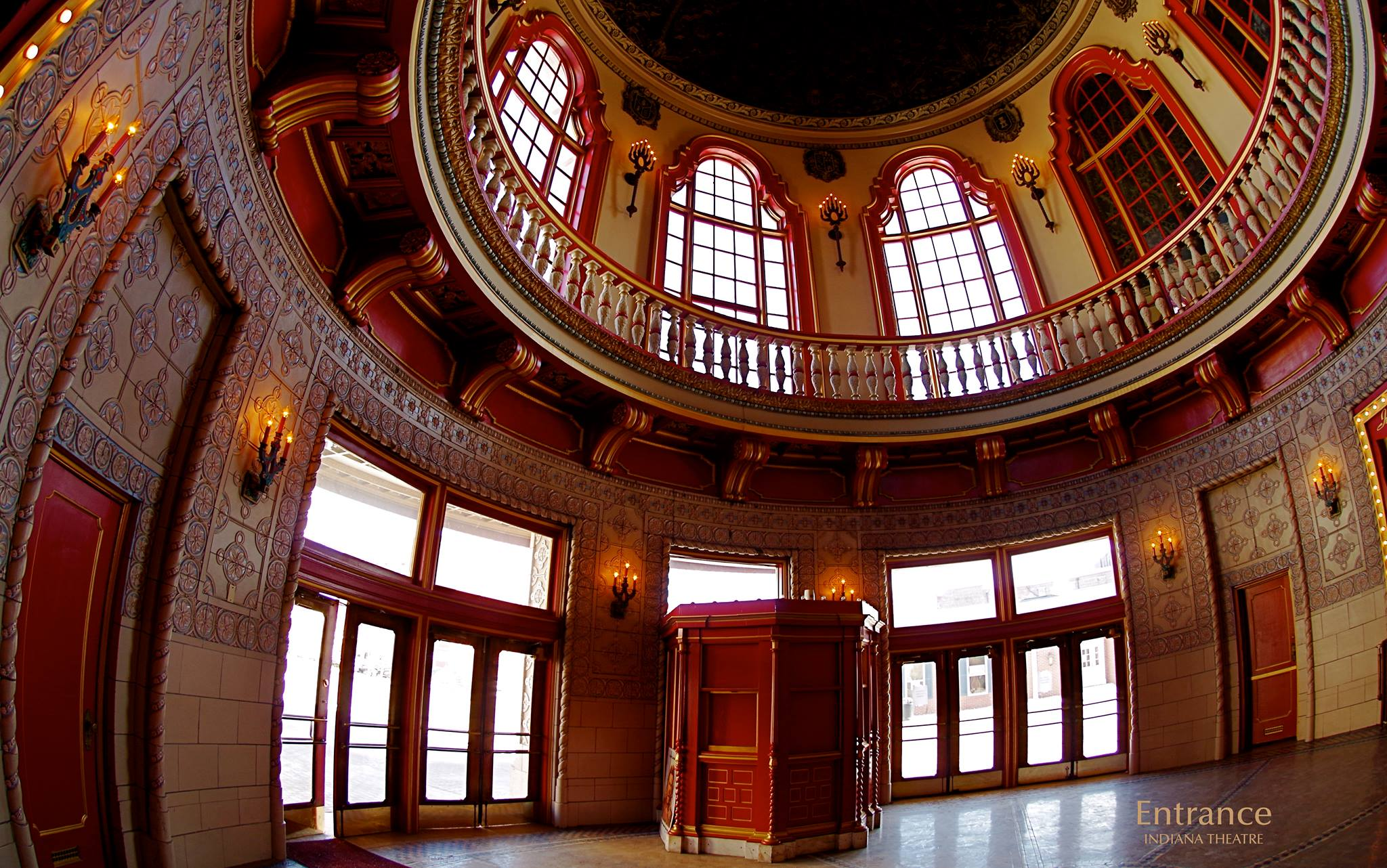
Indiana Theatre rotunda

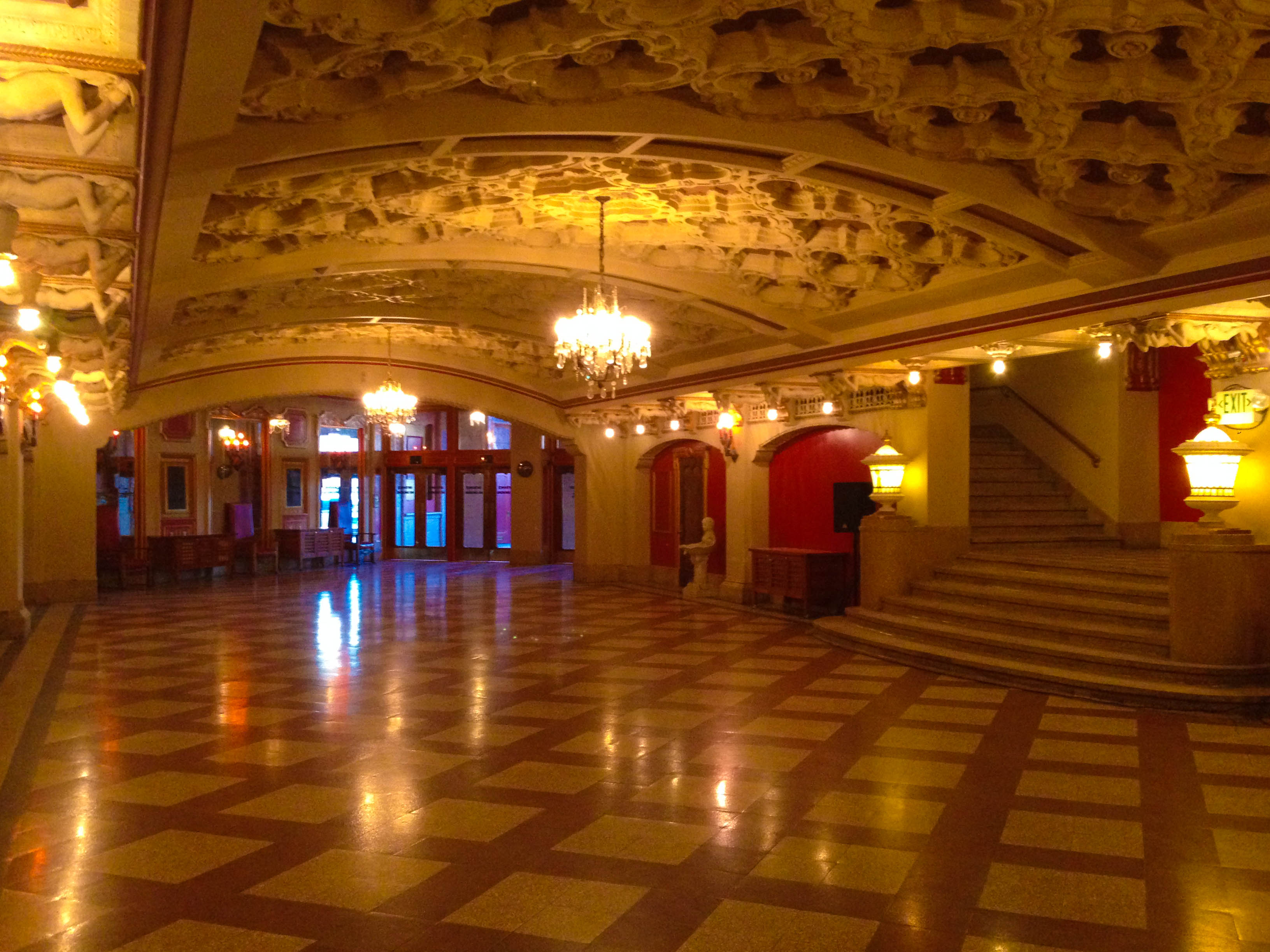
Indiana Theatre lobby ballroom

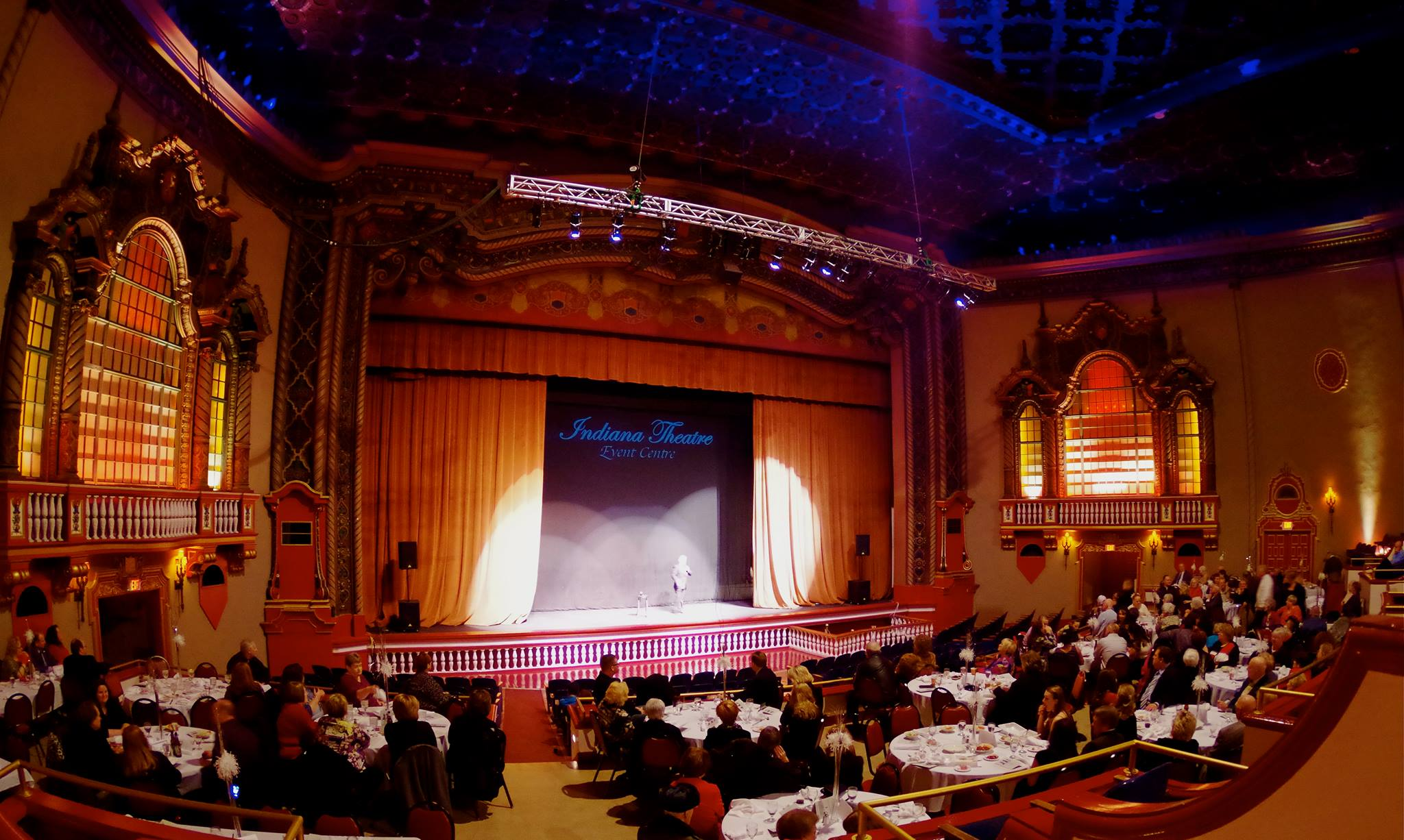
Indiana Theatre auditorium

The Indiana Theatre was designed to emulate the warmth and carefree lifestyle of Spanish Andalusia and the spirit of its people. The ceiling styles were drawn from Moorish designs with the lobby figurines and other building features influenced by Southern Italy. The Theatre was designed to take visitors through the Lifecycle Of A Day with vibrant daybreak, daytime warmth and mystic nightfall. The Rotunda colors shift from light pastel in the churrigueresque to fierce reds and golds of a sunrise in the railing, leaving the remnants of dawn in the deep burgundys of the dome sky. The Lobby Ballroom simulates the more subdued colors and imagery of daytime to transition visitors from morning to nightfall; 38 male & female statues line both sides and an ornate ceiling with even more faces to fill the lobby with life. The Auditorium represents the mystic mystery of nightfall and guests experience the deep tones of reds, blues, and browns. The original lighting system scattered light across the ceiling with special crystal bulb enclosures to simulate a star field. This is in line with the atmospheric design of the ceiling resembling the open sky.

The auditorium was designed without a true balcony; this was intended to make the auditorium reminiscent of a Roman amphitheater built on a hillside. The continuous rise in the seating assured better viewing for all seating. The 6,000 bulb lighting system was greatly hyped prior to the Theatre opening. Lights were rheostatically controlled and could be dimmed to create any color. The opening night program stated “the lighting effects represent in a wonderful manner the Andalusian sunshine in the outer lobbies while one is in the midst of mystic twilight in the main auditorium.” Originally, the projector was in a glass booth in the center of the auditorium, 78 feet from the screen. There was an intercom system so ushers could communicate with others in the auditorium to check on the availability of seats. Part of the system still exits by the Lobby entrance doors.

== The Theatre today ==
Significant paint and plasterwork restoration has been completed around the building and 300 theatre seats were removed to make way for a flat terrace in the auditorium. The orchestra pit was also covered, except for a section that will be the future home of an antique Wurlitzer pipe organ console. The terrace and covered orchestra pit provide valuable open floor space to make the auditorium more versatile and capable of table seating. The terrace can accommodate 175 for table seating and the orchestra deck can hold 25. The lobby can accommodate 200. Portable bars are available in the auditorium and lobby as well. Other upgrades include digital projection, a new sound system, and LED atmospheric lighting. Future upgrades include new theatre seats and expansion in other areas of the building to provide more space for events and amenities.

== See also ==
- Movie palaces list
- National Register of Historic Places listings in Vigo County, Indiana
- Atmospheric theater
- John Eberson
