= John Eberson =

Austrian-American architect (1875–1954)

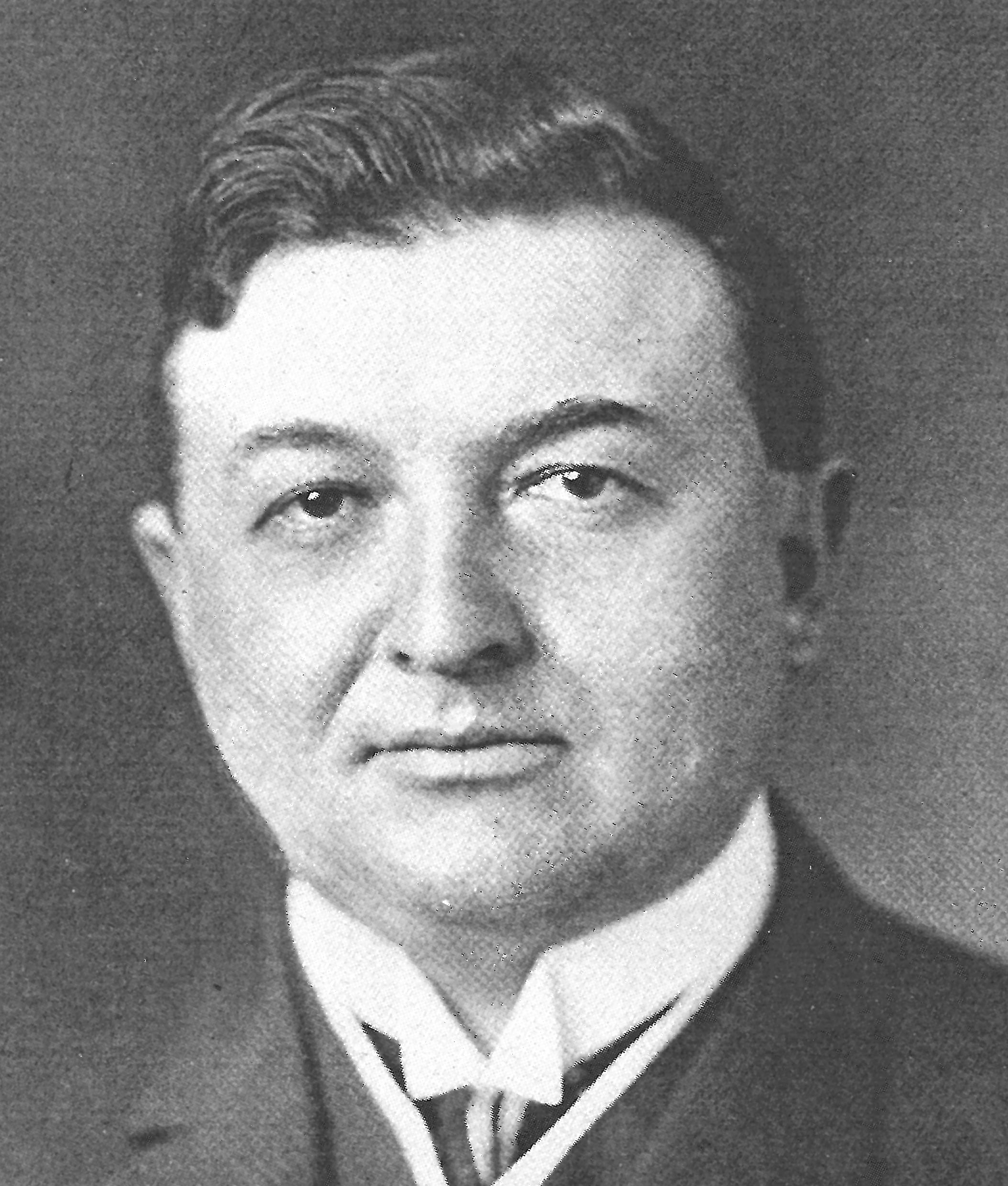
John Adolph Emil Eberson c. 1912

John Adolph Emil Eberson (January 2, 1875 – March 5, 1954) was an Austrian-American architect best known for the development and promotion of movie palace designs in the atmospheric theatre style. He designed over 500 theatres in his lifetime, earning the nickname "Opera House John". His most notable surviving theatres in the United States include the Tampa Theatre (1926), Palace Theatre Marion (1928), Palace Theatre Louisville (1928), Majestic Theatre (1929), Akron Civic Theatre (1929), the Paramount Theatre (1929), the State Theater (Kalamazoo, Michigan) 1927, and the Lewis J. Warner Memorial Theater (1932) at Worcester Academy in Worcester, Massachusetts. Remaining international examples in the atmospheric style include both the Capitol Theatre (1928) and State Theatre (1929) in Sydney, Australia, The Forum (1929, Melbourne, Australia) and Le Grand Rex (1932, Paris, France).

== Life and career ==
John Adolf Emil Eberson was born in Czernowitz, Bukovina, Austria-Hungary, now south western Ukraine, on January 2, 1875. He was the son of Sigfried and Lora (Schmidt) Eberson.

He attended high school in Dresden, Saxony and studied electrical engineering at the University of Vienna. After completing his studies in 1896, Eberson joined the Fourteenth Hussaren Regiment of the Austrian Army.

Eberson immigrated to the United States in 1901, sailing on a ship that left Bremerhaven. He arrived in New York City, and traveled to settle in St. Louis. His first work there was with an electrical contracting company. Within a few years, he affiliated with Johnson Realty and Construction Company, a theatre architecture and construction company. Eberson and Johnson traveled around the eastern part of America, promoting opera houses in small towns. Once the town was persuaded to build an opera house, Eberson would design it and Johnson would build it. It was in this pursuit that Eberson took the title "Opera House John."

Eberson married Beatrice Lamb (1885–1954) in 1903. She immigrated from Great Britain, and was an interior decorator. They had three children, Drew, Lora Mary and Elsa.

In 1904, Eberson and his family moved to Hamilton, Ohio. It was there that Eberson's first theatre was located, the Hamilton Jewel. The 350-seat Jewel was constructed in an existing, pre-Civil War building. While in Hamilton, Eberson designed local buildings, and continued his opera house design work.

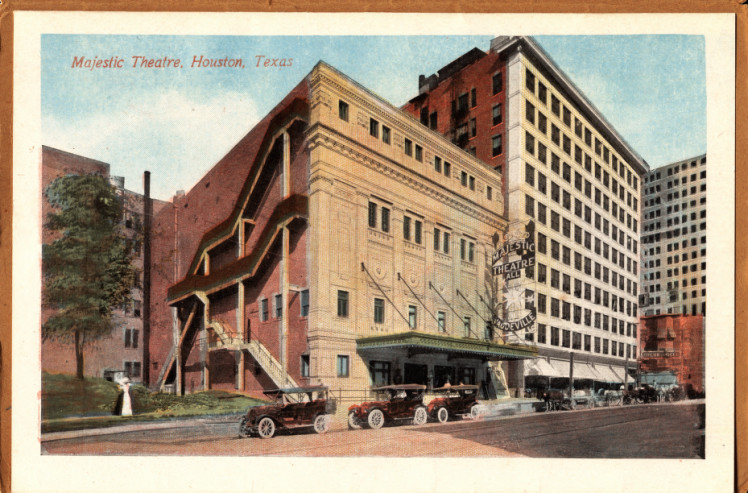
Eberson's first atmospheric theatre, the Majestic in Houston, Texas (now razed)

The Ebersons moved to Chicago in 1910. In Chicago, Eberson was able to increase his theatre architectural commissions. An early client was Karl Hoblitzelle's Interstate Amusement Company. The first two theatres he designed for Hoblitzelle were the Fort Worth Majestic (Fort Worth, Texas, 1911) and the Austin Majestic (Austin, Texas, 1915). Neither was ground-breaking in design, and neither was in the atmospheric style. He first experimented with atmospheric design at the Dallas Majestic (1921), the Indiana Theatre (Terre Haute) (1922) and the Orpheum Theatre (Wichita, Kansas) (1922). It was in the design of the Houston Majestic (1923) that Eberson created his first full atmospheric theatre.

In 1926 Eberson moved to New York City. He opened an office at the Rodin Studios, 200 West Fifty-seventh Street. In July 1929, he made the decision to close the Chicago office and consolidate all of the design work in New York. At about the same time, he formally brought his son Drew Eberson (1904–1989) into the business, although Drew had helped before on many sites. Drew became his partner and carried on the business after his father's death.

Eberson attained national, and even international acclaim for his atmospheric theatres, many of them executed in exotic revival styles, including Italian Renaissance, Spanish Revival, Moorish Revival and others.

== Theatres ==
Eberson began his theatre design work with traditional, small town opera houses. One of the first designs was in Hamilton, Ohio, where he and his family lived. Theatre historian David Naylor described Eberson as "an architectural Johnny Appleseed for Sunbelt theater-goers." He designed traditional opera houses and theatres throughout the South.

In the 1920s, beginning with the Hoblitzelle Majestic Theatre (Houston, 1923, razed), Eberson perfected a new theatre design, which became known as the atmospheric theatre style. Eberson himself credited the Hoblitzelle Majestic Theatre (Houston, 1923, razed) as the first atmospheric style theatre. Clearly, Eberson tried out some of his concepts at the Orpheum Theatre in Wichita, Kansas (1922), and the Indiana Theatre in Terre Haute, Indiana (1922). However, with the Houston Majestic he perfected the style, adding features that made the departure from all that came before.

Many of Eberson's later designs, some executed with his son Drew, were in the art deco and streamline moderne styles. In all, Eberson designed close to 100 movie palaces, located in dozens of states in the United States, including:

- 1905: Hamilton (Ohio) Jewel Theatre
- 1906: Grand Opera House (Federal Style, 1200 seats), 115 East Second Street, Tulsa, OK 74103 (razed 1971)
- 1913: Orpheum (aka Empress, Rialto) Theatre (Neo-Renaissance, 1200 seats), 17 West Third Street, Tulsa, OK 74103 (razed 1971)
- 1915: Hippodrome Theatre, Terre Haute, Indiana
- 1915: The Paramount Theatre, Austin, Texas
- 1917: Palace Theatre, 205 E. Kearsley Street, Flint, Michigan (modernized inside and out 1950, razed 1977)
- 1920: Hippodrome Theater and Ballroom (similar design to Terre Haute Hippodrome, Neo-Renaissance, 2200 seats), 100 East Seventh Street, Okmulgee, Oklahoma 74447 (burned 1934)
- 1921: Majestic Theatre, Dallas, Texas
- 1921: Strand Theatre and Arcade (later Michigan), Lansing, Michigan (auditorium demolished 1984)
- 1922: Indiana Theatre, Terre Haute, Indiana, 683 Ohio Street (Eberson's first theatre with the beginning of atmospheric design elements; the Indiana Theatre was constructed eight months before the Orpheum. Completed January 28, 1922.)
- 1922: Orpheum, 200 North Broadway, Wichita, Kansas
- 1923: Majestic Theater, Houston, Texas (Eberson's first fully atmospheric theater) (demolished 1971)
- 1924: Palace Theater, Gary, Indiana (closed since 1989)
- 1924: Orpheum Theater (Renaissance Revival, 1400 seats), 12 East Fourth Street, Tulsa, Oklahoma 74103 (razed 1971)
- 1925: Capitol Theater, Chicago, Illinois (demolished 1985)
- 1925: Riviera Theatre, Detroit Michigan (demolished 1990s)
- 1926: Palace Theatre, Canton, Ohio. Listed on the National Register of Historic Places on April 26, 1979.
- 1926: Olympia Theater, Miami, Florida
- 1926: Tampa Theatre, Tampa, Florida; listed on the National Register of Historic Places, 1978
- 1926: Valencia Theater, Baltimore, Maryland (demolished 1962)
- 1926: Roger Sherman Theater (Atmospheric, 2000 seats), 238 College Street, New Haven, Connecticut
- 1926: Ritz Theater (Atmospheric, 1400 seats), 18 West Fourth Street, Tulsa, Oklahoma 74103 (auditorium razed 1963)
- 1927: Loew's Theater (now Richmond CenterStage), Richmond, Virginia
- 1927: Riviera Theater, Omaha, Nebraska (now restored and renamed the Rose Theater)
- 1927: State Theatre, Kalamazoo, Michigan
- 1927: Capitol Theatre, 140 E. Second St., Flint, Michigan; listed on the National Register of Historic Places, 1985
- 1927: Annex Theater, Detroit, Michigan (demolished 1960)
- 1927: Universal Theater (Atmospheric, 2400 seats) (Brooklyn, New York); mostly known as the 46th Street Theatre (razed 2015)
- 1927: Capitol Theater (Grand Island, Nebraska) (demolished 1986)
- 1928: New Regal Theater (formerly Avalon Theater), Chicago, Illinois
- 1928: Embassy Theatre, Fort Wayne, Indiana; listed on the National Register of Historic Places, 1975
- 1928: The Louisville Palace, Louisville, Kentucky
- 1928: Uptown Theater, Kansas City, Missouri
- 1928: The Palace Theatre, Marion, Ohio; listed on the National Register of Historic Places, 1975
- 1928: Paradise Theater (Chicago, Illinois) (demolished 1956–58)
- 1928: Capitol Theatre, Sydney, Australia, live theatre designed by Henry Eli White with John Eberson
- 1928: Ambassadors Theatre, (Perth, Australia) (demolished 1972)
- 1929: Loew's Theatre, Akron, Ohio (now Akron Civic Theatre)
- 1929: Loew's Paradise Theatre, The Bronx, New York (one of the five Loew's Wonder Theaters, which were Loew's flagship theaters in the New York City area)
- 1929: Loew's Valencia Theatre, Queens, New York, another of the 5 Loew's Wonder Theaters
- 1929: Paramount Theatre, Anderson, Indiana
- 1929: State Theatre, Melbourne, Australia, twinned 1962/63, live concert and cinema venue. Listed on the Victorian Heritage Register in 1978 and classified by the National Trust of Australia in 1994
- 1929: State Theatre, Sydney, Australia designed with Henry Eli White
- 1929: Memorial Theater, [McKeesport, Pennsylvania] (demolished 1985)
- 1929: Majestic Theatre, San Antonio, Texas listed on the National Register of Historical Places 1975 and was designated a National Historic Landmark in 1991
- 1931: The Warner Theatre, Morgantown, West Virginia
- 1930: Midwest Theatre (Atmospheric, 1700 seats), 16 North Harvey Avenue, Oklahoma City, Oklahoma 73102 (razed 1975)
- 1931: Plaza Theater, Schenectady, New York (demolished 1964)
- 1931: Palace Theatre, Albany, New York
- 1932: The Lewis J. Warner Memorial Theater, Worcester Academy, Worcester, Massachusetts, a memorial to the son of Harry Warner, president of Warner Bros.
- 1932: Loew's 72nd Street Theater [Manhattan, New York] Eberson's last atmospheric design with Thomas Lamb (closed 1961 and subsequently demolished)
- 1932: Le Grand Rex, Paris, France, as consulting architect to Auguste Bluysen
- 1936: Dixie Theater, Staunton, Virginia
- 1936: Palace Theatre, Lockport, New York renovation/redesign of interior; departure from his atmospheric style
- 1936: Sag Harbor Cinema, Main Street Sag Harbor, New York (burned December, 2016)
- 1937: Yeadon Theater, Yeadon Pennsylvania (demolished 2006)
- 1937: Colony Theater, Shaker Heights, Ohio; first opened December 28, 1937, it has been renovated and is now known as the Shaker Square Cinemas
- 1938: Lakewood Theater, Dallas, Texas
- 1938: Bethesda Theater, Bethesda, Maryland; listed on the National Register of Historic Places, 1999
- 1938: Silver Theater, Silver Spring, Maryland
- 1938: Schines Auburn Theatre, Auburn, New York; listed on the National Register of Historic Places, 2000
- 1939: Glove Theatre, Gloversville, New York
- 1940: Oswego Theater, Oswego, New York; listed on the National Register of Historic Places, 1988
- 1941: The Norwalk Theatre, Norwalk, Ohio
- 1941: Schines Theatre, Ashland, Ohio; listed on the National Register of Historic Places, 2012; currently undergoing restoration
- 1946: Woodlawn Theatre, San Antonio, Texas
- 1950: Teatro Junin, Caracas, Venezuela

Other theatres were designed in Mexico City, Mexico, Perth, Sydney and Melbourne, Australia.

A significant number of his estimated 500 buildings, and including an estimated 100 atmospheric theatres, have been destroyed. Many were victims of redevelopment; changing taste came to consider the style dated, and the rise of television reduced the demand for theaters with very large auditoriums, with newer business models calling for several smaller auditoriums on one site to allow the screening of several pictures simultaneously rather than just one.

== Other works ==
Eberson and his architectural firm also designed other buildings. His earliest commission was in Hamilton, Ohio, where the Ebersons made their home beginning in 1904. His first commissioned job was that same year, when he designed an Ionic-columned porch for Mrs. Sheehan, a Hamilton resident, for which he received $20.

Terre Haute, Indiana is home of Eberson's Indiana Theatre, and to one of Eberson's earliest theaters, the Hippodrome Theatre, which opened in 1915. Branching out from his usual theater design, Eberson also designed the home of Theodore W. Barhydt, the man who commissioned Eberson for the Hippodrome and Indiana Theatres. Terre Haute is one of the few places in the world to boast multiple Eberson buildings, including his only residential design.

Eberson designed the Central National Bank, a 23-story art deco skyscraper in Richmond, Virginia (completed in 1929).

Eberson helped with the war effort during World War II. He designed a hospital on Long Island, and housing at Fort Monmouth, New Jersey and at the United States Military Academy.

His other works included the YWCA Hotel (1931) (atmospheric) Cafeteria, & Gym, 320 NW 1st St, Oklahoma City, Oklahoma (razed 1975).

== Gallery ==
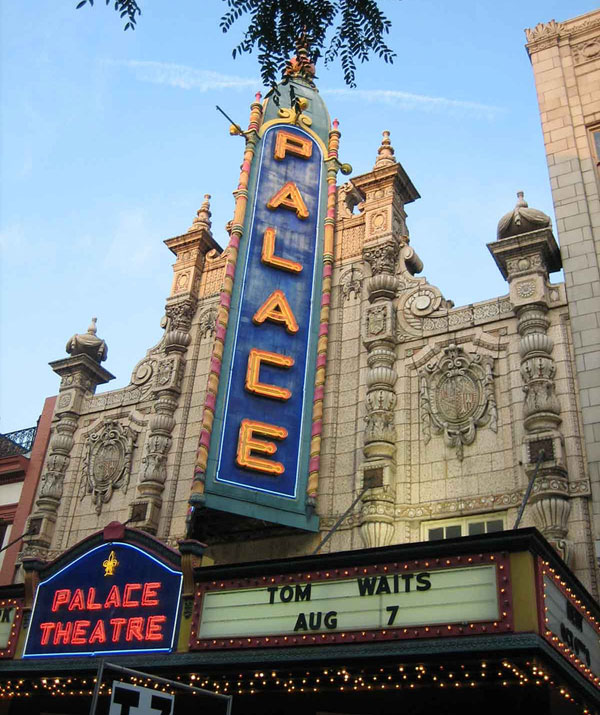
Louisville Palace, Louisville, Kentucky

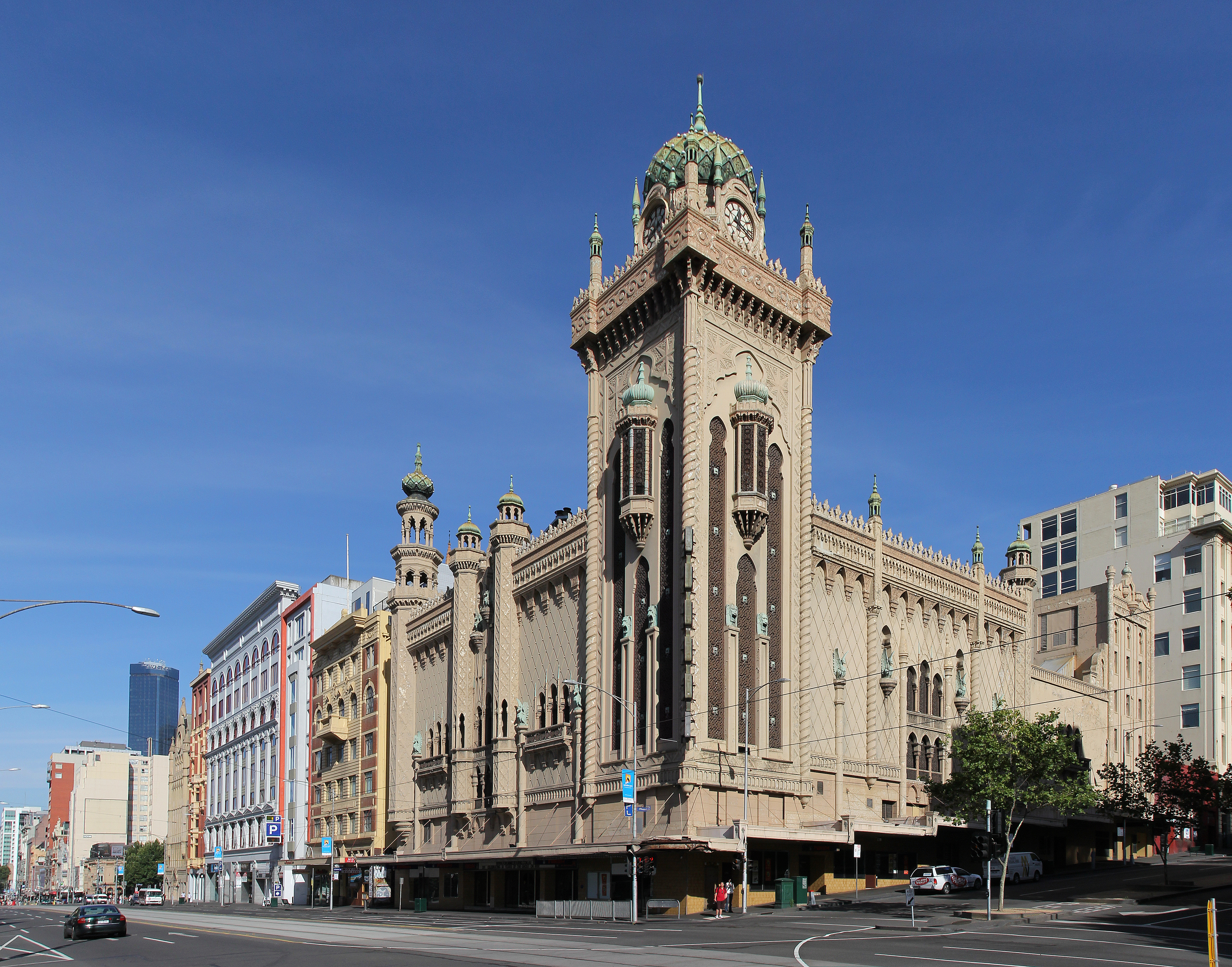
State Theatre, Melbourne, Australia

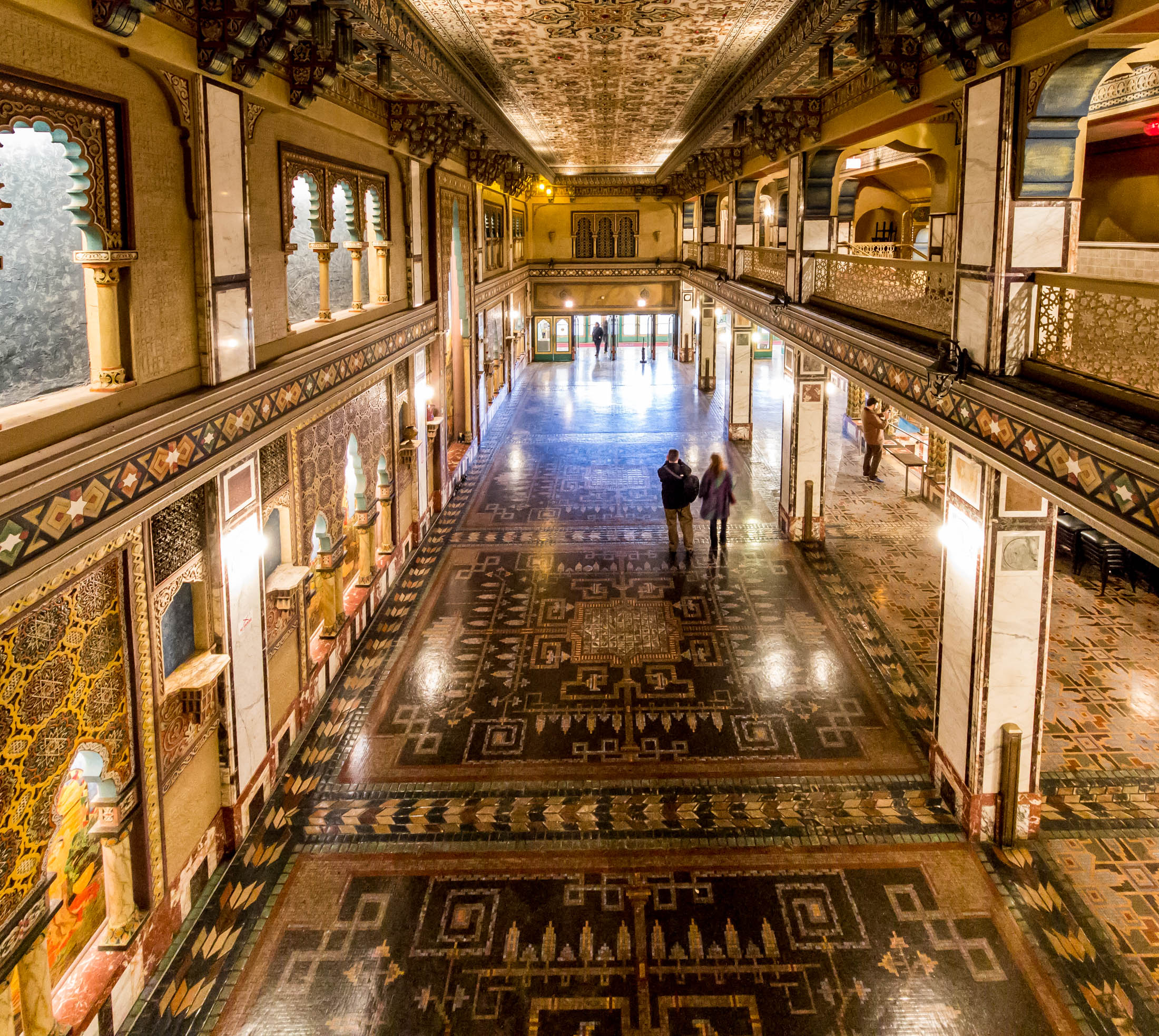
Lobby of the Avalon Regal Theater, Chicago, Illinois

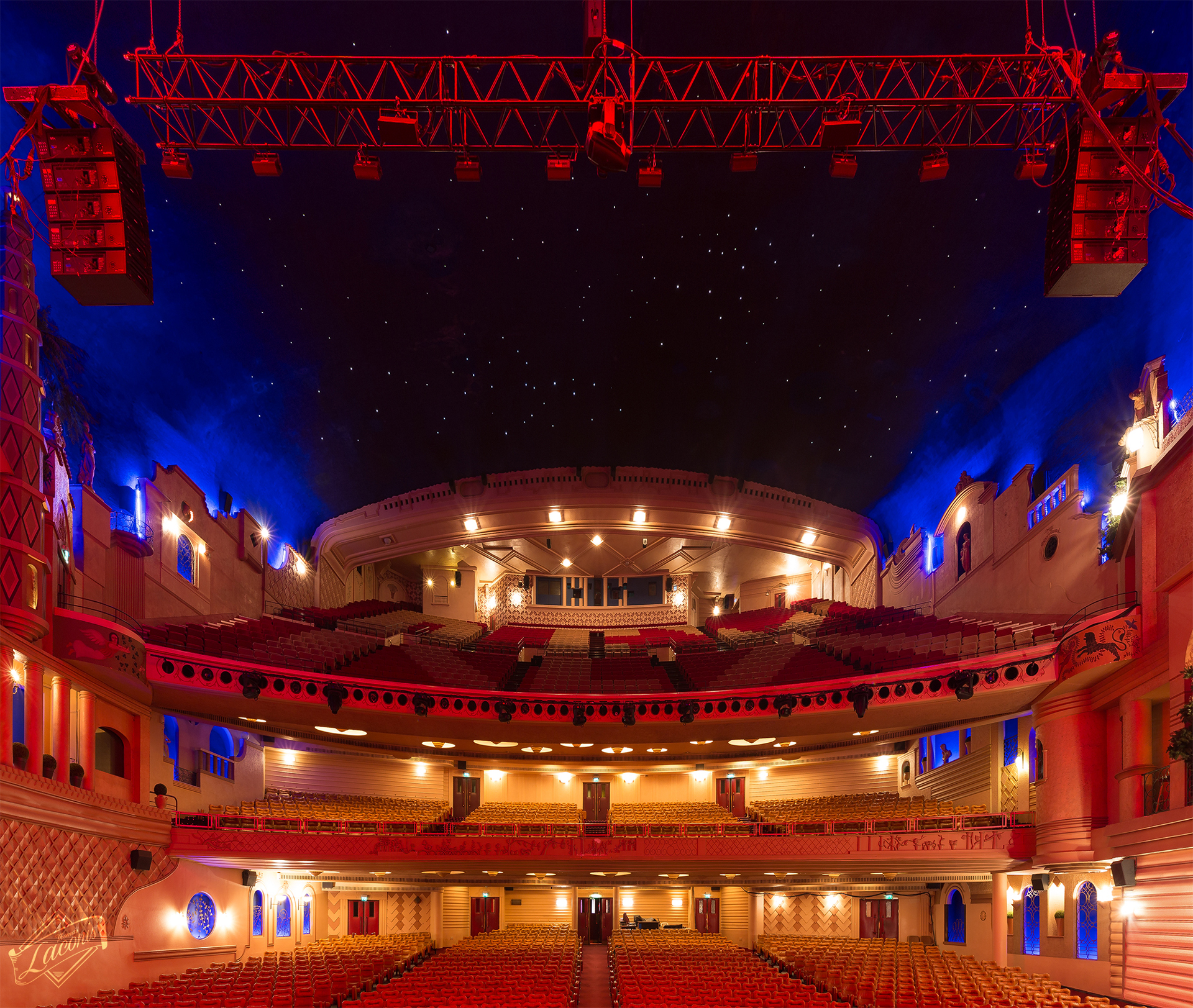
Le Grand Rex's "Grande Salle", Paris, France

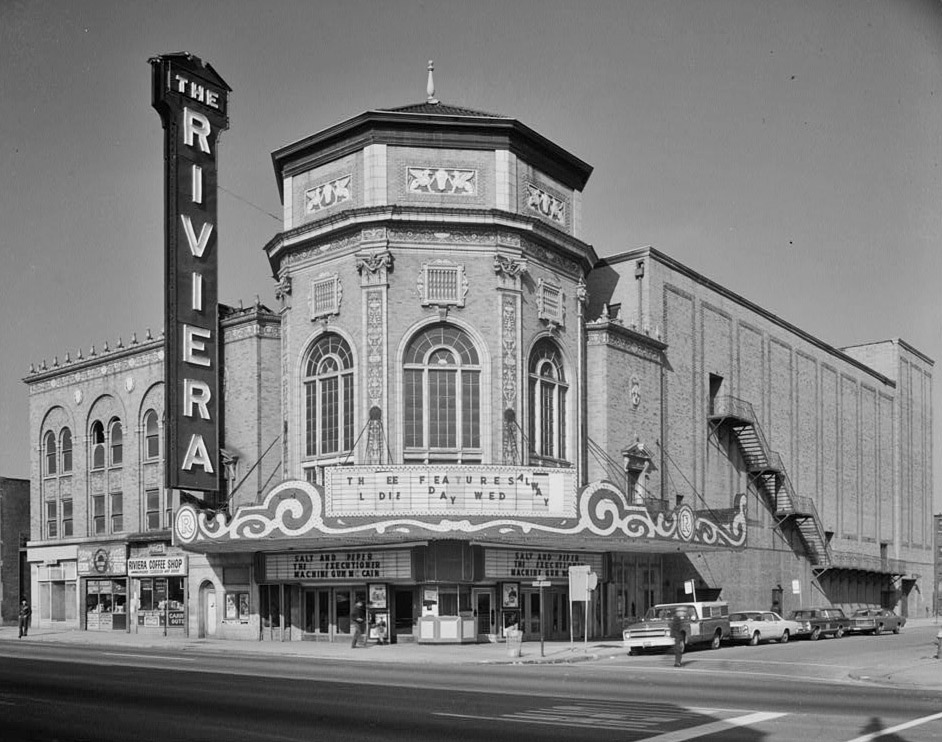
Grand Riviera Theater (demolished), Detroit, Michigan

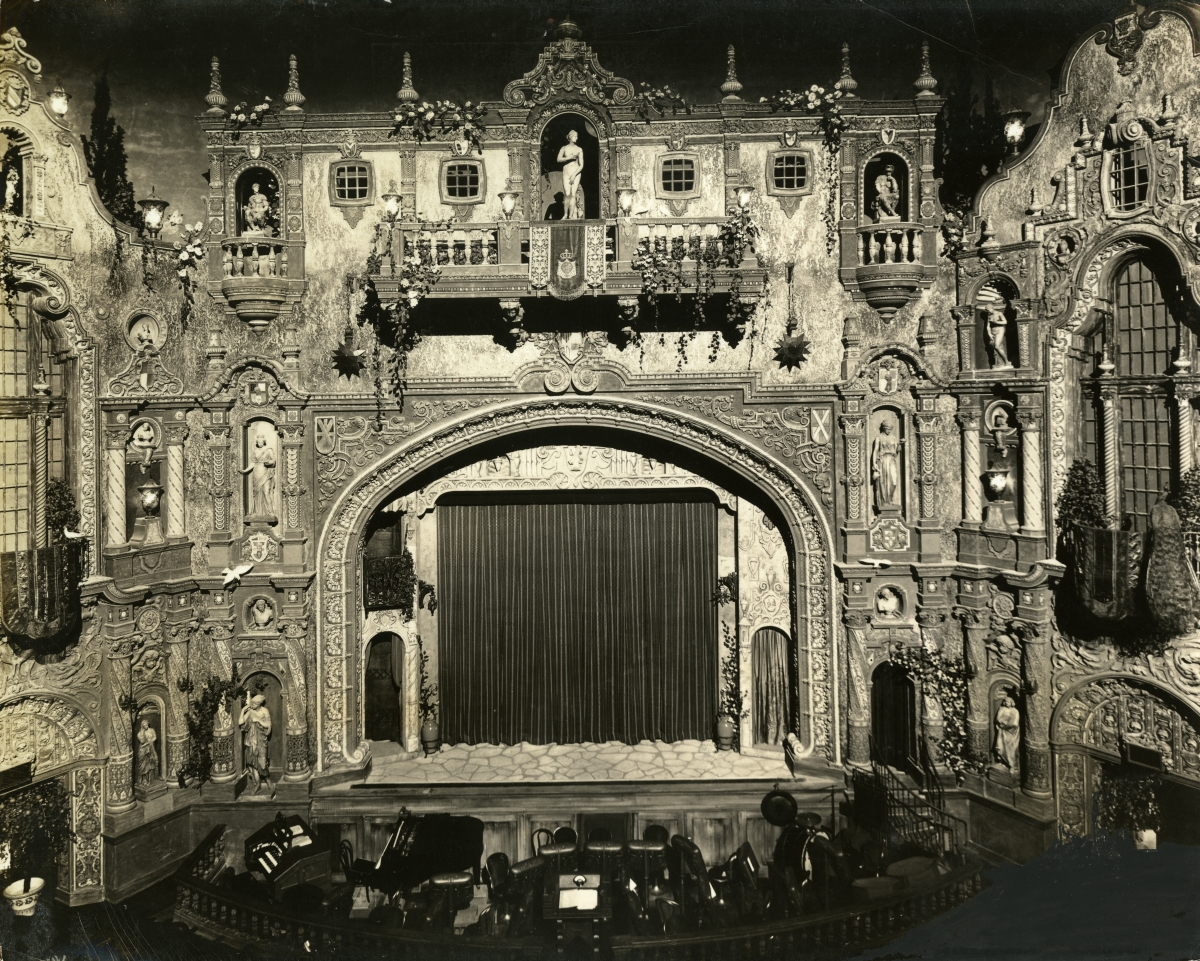
Tampa Theatre interiors, 1930s
