= The Norwalk Theatre =

Theatre building in Norwalk, Ohio, US

The braden Theatre
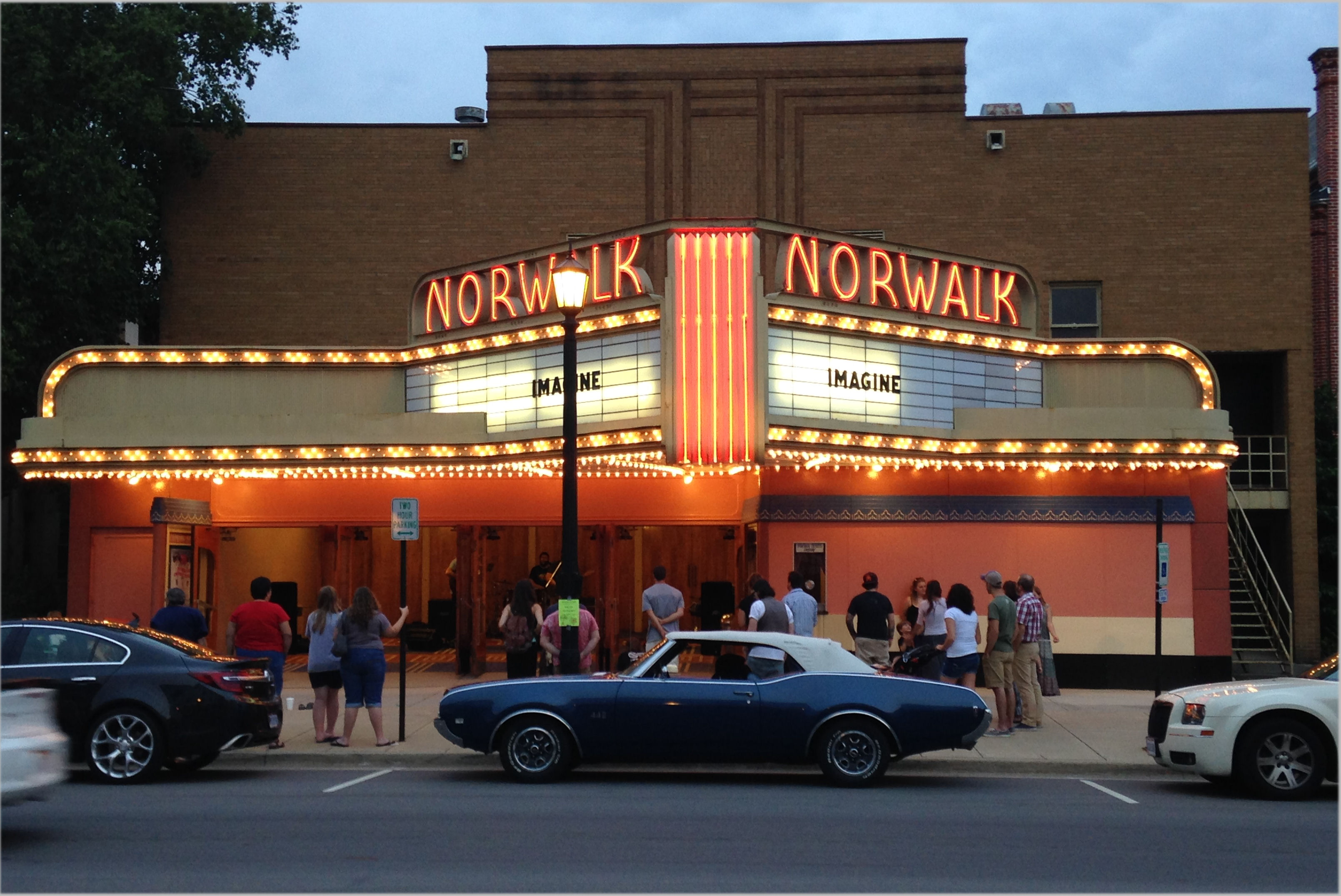
- The Norwalk Theatre Façade

- Location within Ohio

General information
- Architectural style: Streamline Moderne
- Location: 57 East Main St., Norwalk, Ohio, United States
- Coordinates: 41°14′37.29″N 82°36′48.69″W
- Opened: August 13th, 1941
- Owner: Norwalk Arts Center, LLC

Design and construction
- Architect: John Eberson

The Norwalk Theatre is a historic theatre building located at 57 East Main Street in Norwalk, Ohio, United States. It is owned by the Norwalk Arts Center, LLC, and is a textbook example of the pre-World War II Art Deco style of architecture. Designed by the noted theatre architect John Eberson, the theatre was completed in 1941. It features a porcelain enamel and brick facade and the largest marquee in the state of Ohio. It was listed on the National Register of Historic Places in 2022.

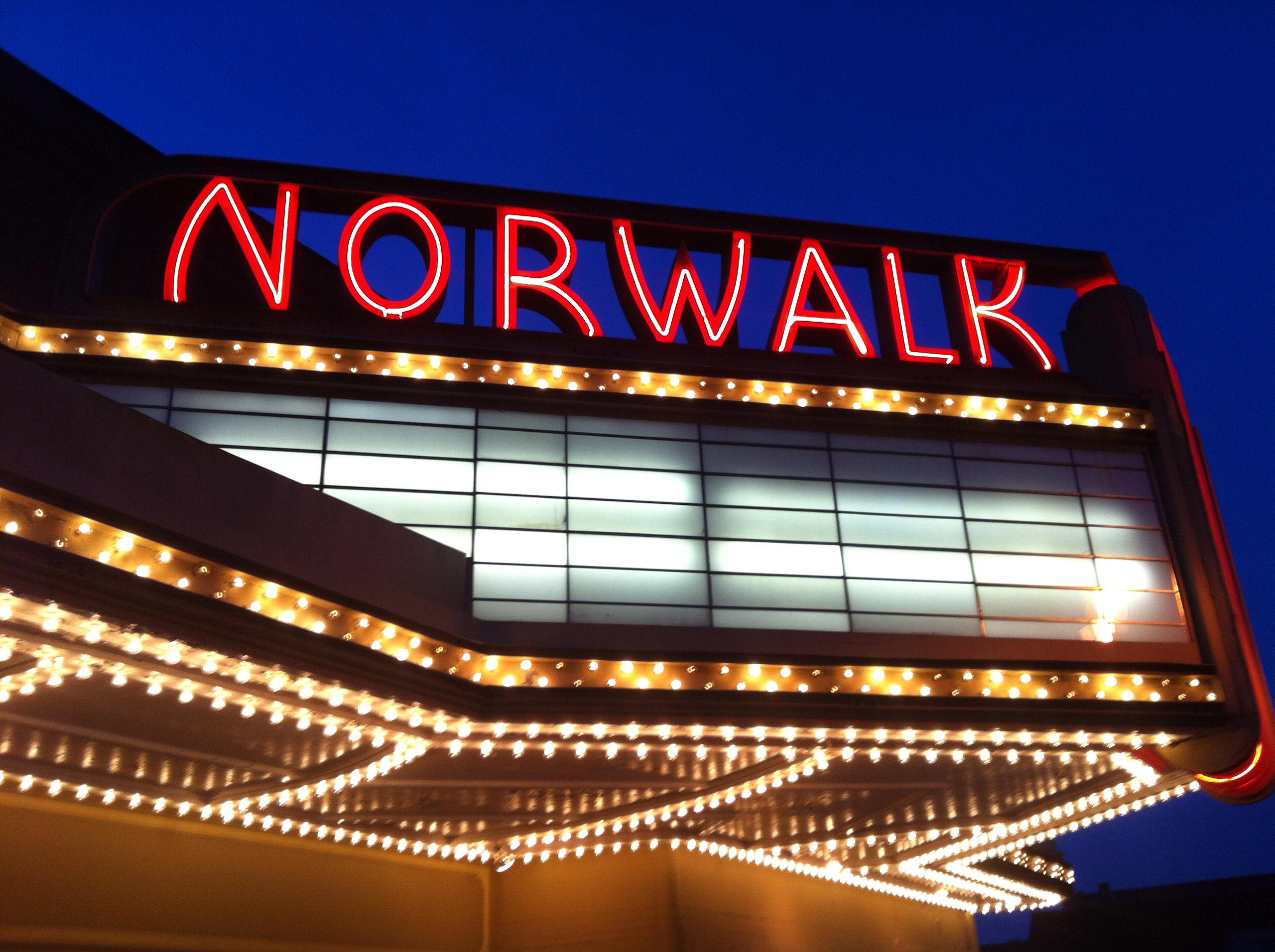
The Norwalk Theatre marquee illuminated at night

Built for Schine Chain Theatres, Inc., the theatre was air conditioned using the latest available equipment, and it offered customers with hearing loss special headphones to better enjoy the films. It was originally outfitted with 1,111 seats (901 on the main floor, 210 in the balcony). The theatre currently features 924 seats due to the later addition of an expanded stage, orchestra pit, and theatre organ. A special elevator assembly allows the theatre organ to be lifted to stage height for pre-show music performances.

Outside, the marquee features both neon and incandescent illumination, with a portion of the incandescent bulbs (surrounding the vertical panels) operated by a mechanical chaser motor. Interior and exterior art deco fixtures and décor all remain as when built, with the exception of the front office/candy shop area, which was revised to accommodate the addition of restrooms with increased accessibility.

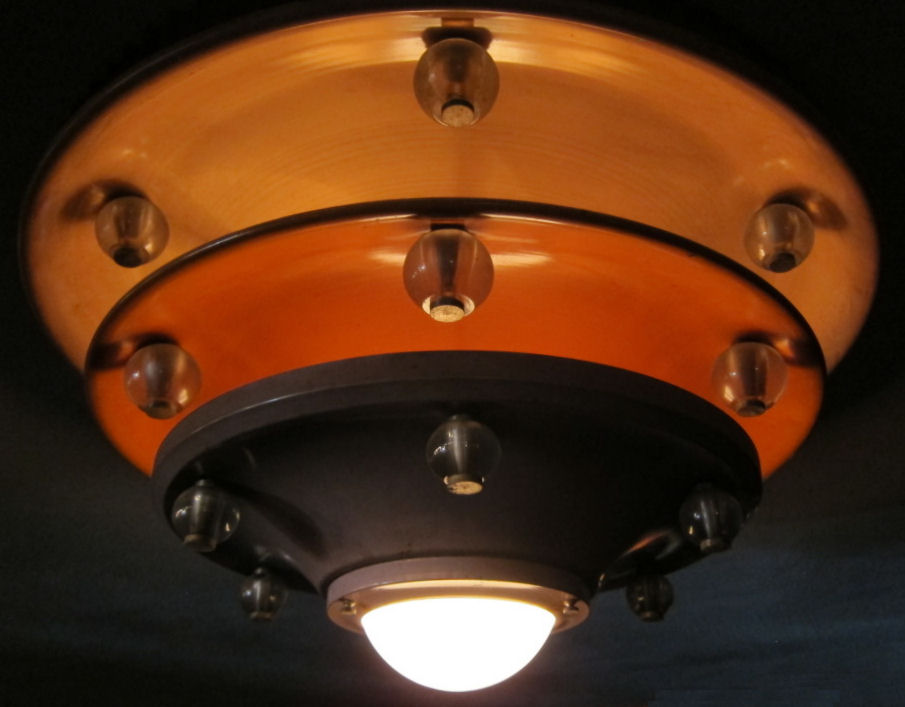
Light Fixture

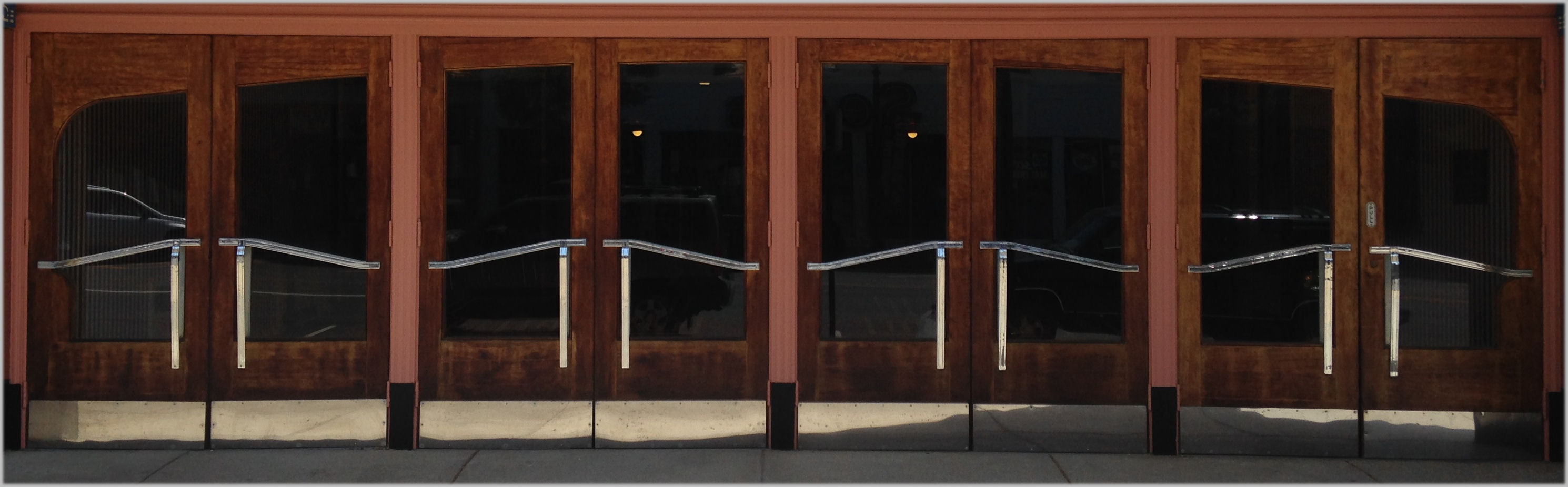
Theatre Doors

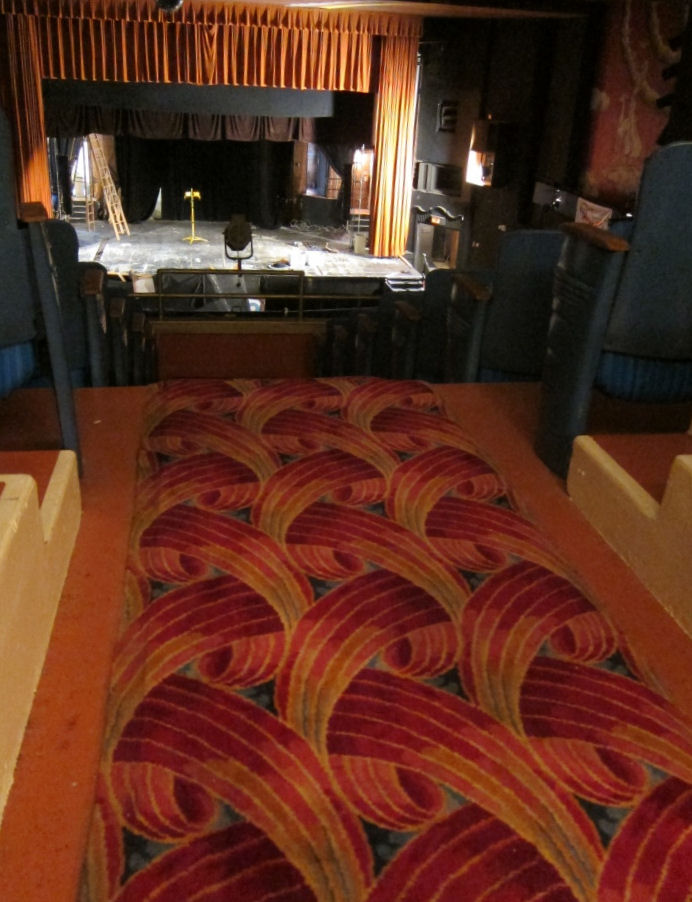
Balcony Carpet

In the auditorium, large art deco murals depicting a goddess (possibly Diana) with wildlife were painted by Edoardo G. Battisti of Battisti Studios in New York, a firm responsible for the interior decoration within many theatres of this era.

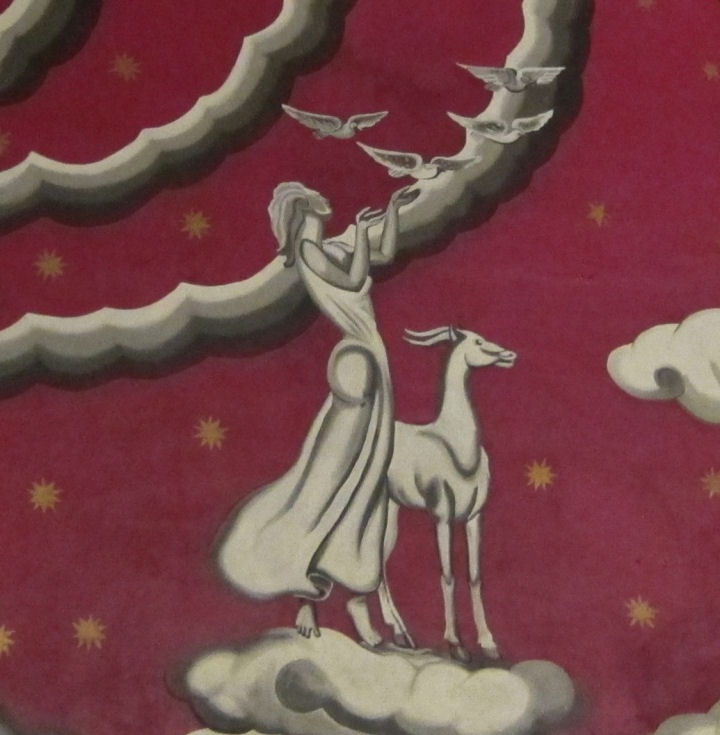
Auditorium Mural

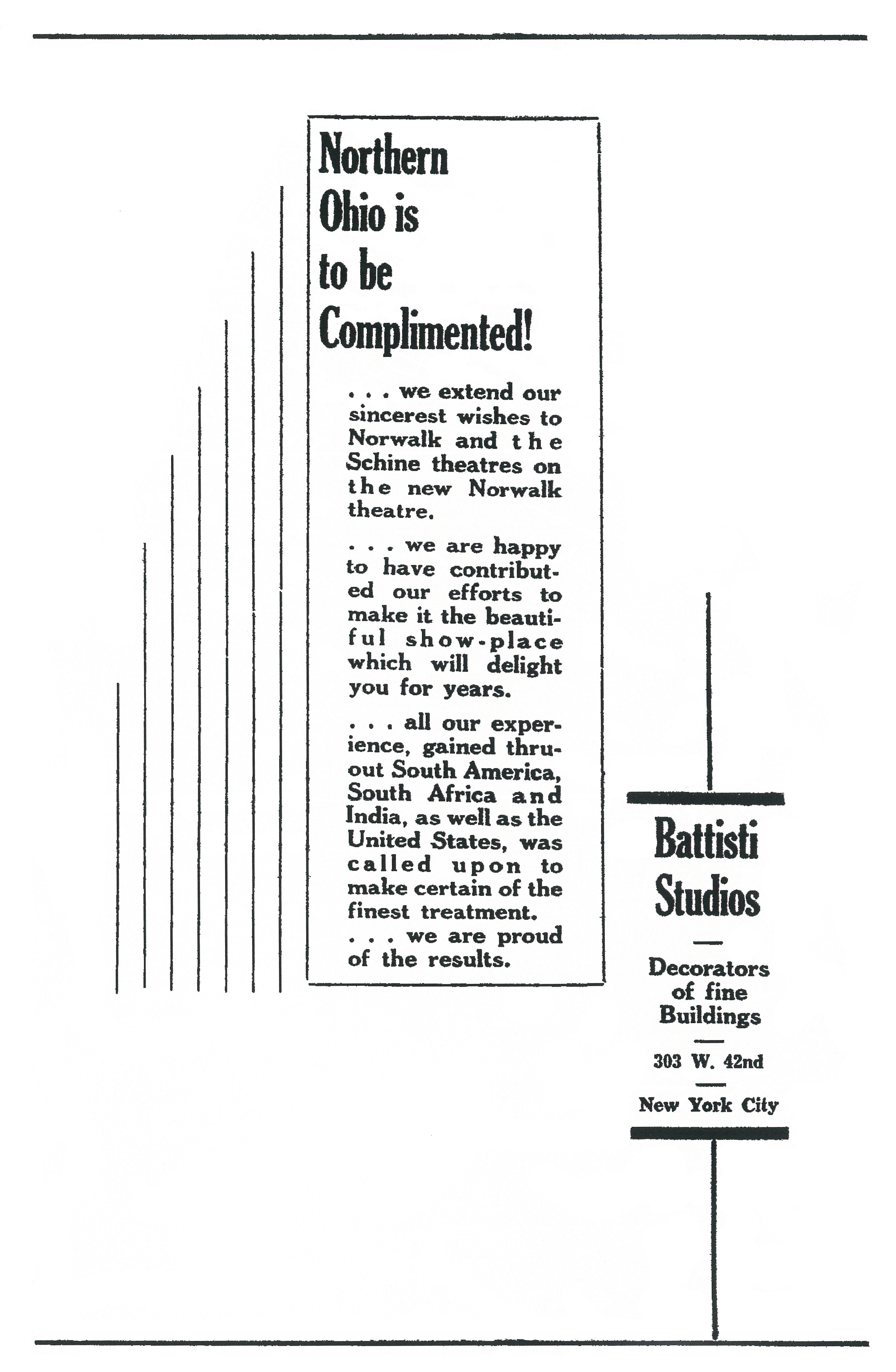
Battisti Advertisement

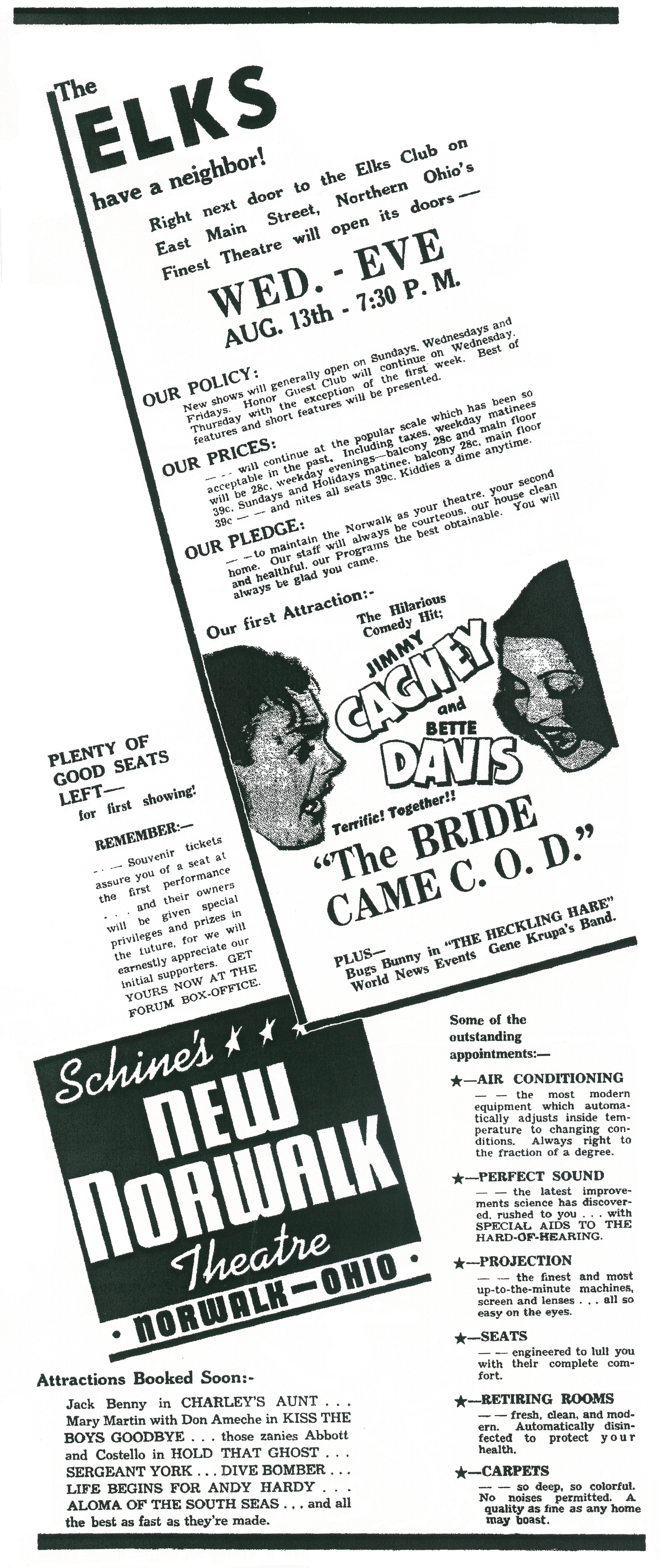
Opening Night Ad

The theatre opened to the public on August 13, 1941, with the showing of The Bride Came C.O.D. and various other shorts, including Bugs Bunny in The Heckling Hare.

The theatre has been undergoing renovation since 2012, and a project completion date is uncertain at this time.
