= Palace Theater (Gary, Indiana) =

Movie theater in Gary, Indiana, United States

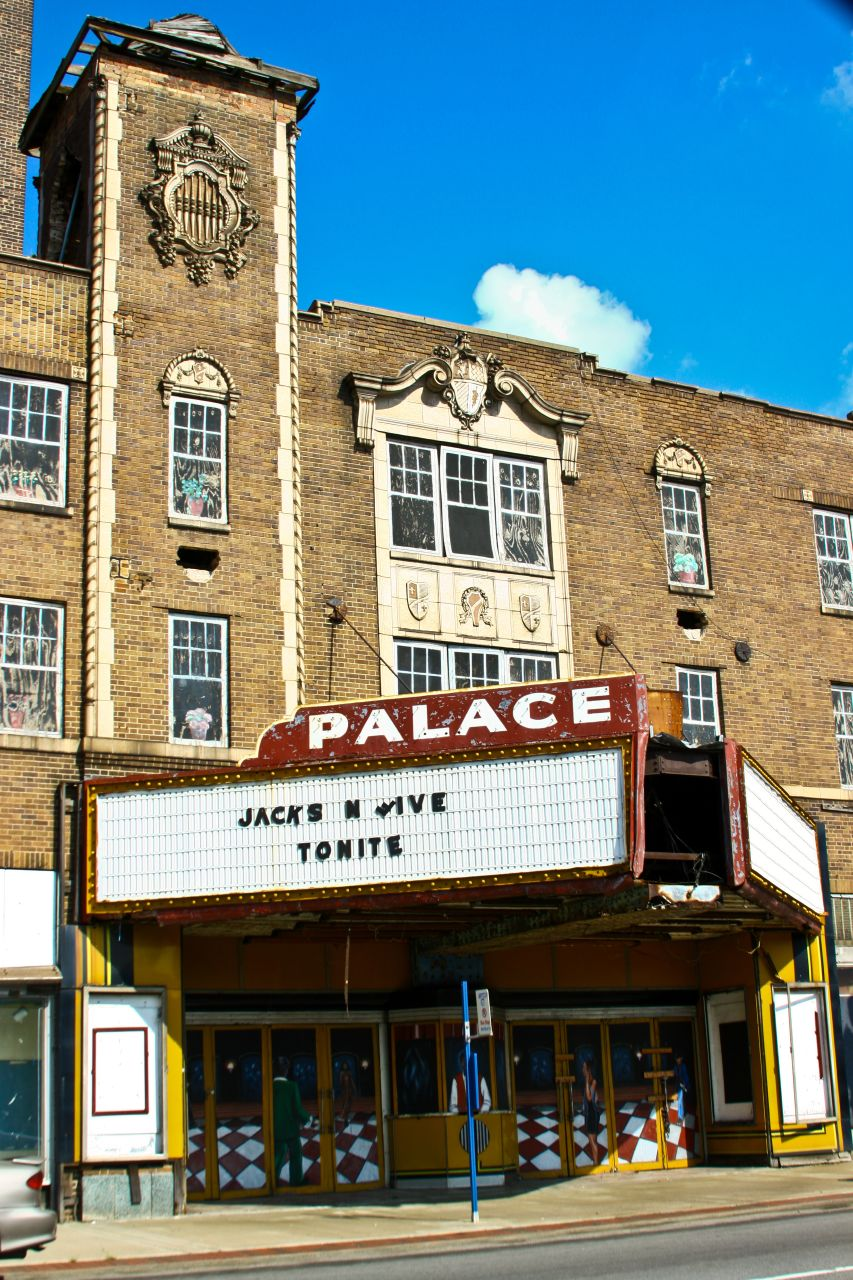
- The Palace Theater
- Interactive map of Palace Theater
- Address: 791 Broadway; Gary, Indiana; United States
- Coordinates: 41.596781°N 87.336964°W
- Type: Movie palace
- Current use: Closed

Construction
- Opened: October 30, 1925
- Closed: December 24, 1989
- Years active: 1925 - 1989
- Architect: John Eberson

The Palace Theater is a 1925 movie theater, now closed, located at 791 Broadway in Gary, Indiana, in the city's Emerson neighborhood. It was designed by the prominent movie palace architect John Eberson.

== History ==
The Palace Theater was built by Maximillian Dubois' construction company "Max and Sons", who also built the Marquette Park Pavilion in Gary. Construction began in 1924 and the theater opened a year later featuring live stage shows, vaudeville acts, and motion pictures.

From the time it opened, the theater was one of the grandest venues in the town, but when the US Steel plant in Gary went into decline, so did the rest of the town, including the historic theater. The theater slid into decline, and eventually closed entirely on December 24, 1989. The building was repurposed for other uses but by 1993, the building was completely abandoned.

The abandoned theater has since come to be a common symbol of urban decay, and is a frequent subject of photography and urban exploration. The exterior ornamentation has been largely picked away by scavengers, leaving gaping holes in the sides of the building.

In 2018, private investors planned to spend over $500,000 to renovate the theater and the nearby storefronts, but eventually abandoned the deal after the first restaurant opened was unsuccessful.

When the Miss USA pageant was held in Gary in 2002, Donald Trump renovated the front of the theater. Sheets of plywood covering the windows were painted to depict a false interior, and an external marquee was mounted, declaring "Jackson Five Tonite". Google Street View and the show Life After People: The Series (Season 1, Episode 2) show the marquee unchanged as of 2009. Plastic signs reading "Jackson Five Forever" were placed on both sides of the marquee after the death of Michael Jackson. Both signs have since been lost to the wind.

In 2012 there is renewed interest in reviving the theater. Supporters of the Palace have established a page on Facebook to generate support for restoration of the theater.

== Popular culture ==
The Palace Theater was used as an example for what could happen to a Chicago building in 30 years without humans providing maintenance and upkeep on Life After People: The Series (Season 1, Episode 2).
