= Wabash Avenue–East Historic District =

Historic district in Indiana, United States

- U.S. National Register of Historic Places
- U.S. Historic district
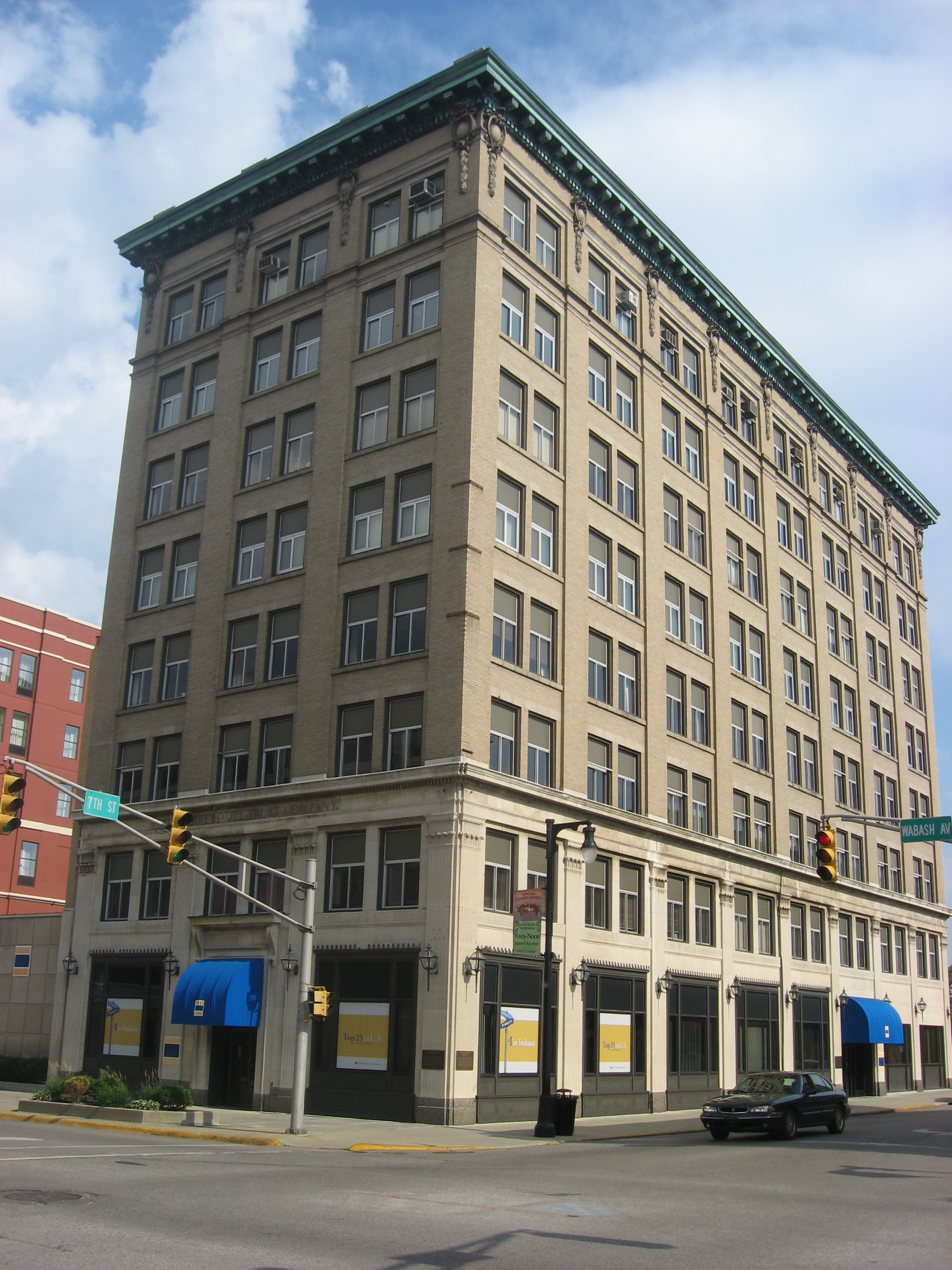
- Building in the Wabash Avenue–East HD, July 2011

- Location within Vigo County, Indiana Location within Indiana Location within the United States
- Location: Wabash Ave. and 7th and 8th Sts.; also 26-34 8th St.; also roughly bounded by 6th, Ohio, 7th, and Walnut Sts., Terre Haute, Indiana
- Coordinates: 39°27′59″N 87°24′24″W
- Area: 3.5 acres (1.4 ha)
- Built: 1870
- Architect: Eberson, John; Sherman, J. Merrill; et al.
- Architectural style: Renaissance, Italianate, Romanesque, Early Commercial, Art Deco
- MPS: Downtown Terre Haute MRA
- NRHP reference No.: 83000040, September 16, 1992 (Boundary Increase), 06000851 (Boundary Increase and Decrease)
- Added to NRHP: June 30, 1983, September 16, 1992, September 20, 2006

Wabash Avenue–East Historic District is a national historic district located at Terre Haute, Indiana. It encompasses 20 contributing buildings in the central business district of Terre Haute. It developed between about 1880 and 1940 and includes representative examples of Italianate, Romanesque Revival, Renaissance Revival, and Art Deco style architecture. Located in the district is the separately listed Indiana Theatre. Other notable buildings include The Kaufman Block (1863–1868), Terre Haute Trust Company (1908), the Tribune Building (1912), Bement-Rea Warehouse (1908), Swope Block (1901), AT&T Building (c. 1940), and Ohio Building (1912).

It was listed on the National Register of Historic Places in 1983, with boundary adjustments in 1992 (5 properties removed, one new property added) and in 2006 (3 properties removed, 13 new properties added).
