= Oswego Theater =

- U.S. National Register of Historic Places
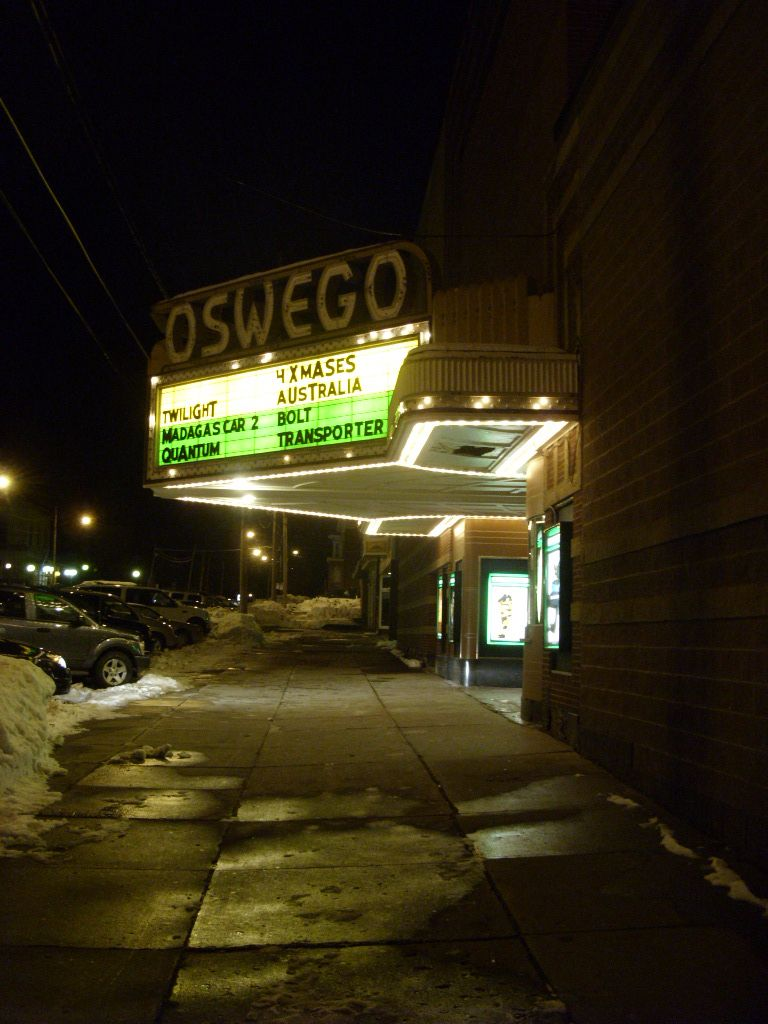
- Theater in 2008

- Location within New York Location within the United States
- Location: 138 W. Second St., Oswego, New York
- Coordinates: 43°27′21″N 76°30′46″W
- Area: less than one acre
- Built: 1940
- Architect: Eberson, John; M. Shapiro & Sons
- Architectural style: Art Deco
- NRHP reference No.: 88001590
- Added to NRHP: September 19, 1988

Oswego Theater, now known as Oswego 7 Cinemas, is a historic movie theater located at Oswego in Oswego County, New York. It was designed in 1940 in the Art Deco style and opened in 1941. The front features bands of yellow, red, and dark red brick that create broad horizontal and perpendicular belts. A pair of cast stone, accordion pleated vertical stripes are included on the facade. It was designed by architect John Eberson (1875–1964).

It was listed on the National Register of Historic Places in 1988.
