= Warner Theatre (Morgantown, West Virginia) =

Defunct theatre in Morgantown, West Virginia, U.S.

Coordinates: 39.62859°N 79.95718°W

Warner Theatre

The Warner Theater is a historic Art Deco movie theater at 147 High Street in downtown Morgantown, West Virginia, United States.

== History and architectural features ==
Opened June 12, 1931, it was designed by architect John Eberson, whose theaters included the since-demolished Colonial and Astor in Philadelphia, Pennsylvania, the Calvert in Washington, D.C., and the Capitol in Chicago, Illinois; and the extant Cinema le Grand Rex in Paris, France, the Capitol in Sydney, Australia, the Dixie in Staunton, Virginia, and the American in the Bronx, New York City.

The Warner Theatre cost $400,000 to construct. It featured a 50-foot vertical marquee illuminated with over 6,000 light bulbs of different colors, The vertical marquee has since been removed, and many of the original light bulbs on the rest of the marquee were replaced with neon strips.

Don Knotts worked at the Warner Theatre while he was a student at West Virginia University. On March 20, 1964, the Warner Theatre hosted the national premiere of The Incredible Mr. Limpet, a Live-action/animated film featuring actor Don Knotts.

== Round Table Corporation ownership and 2010 closure ==
The Round Table Corporation purchased the theater in 2004 with the intention of restoring it to its original condition. The once single-screen theater became a multiplex in the early 1970s.

After 79 years of business, The Warner Theater closed on September 5, 2010.

Several factors contributed to this closure. One such cause was a growing maintenance backlog. The heating, cooling, and projection systems were in need of replacement. The condition of the roof was also a major issue. Several leaks had caused brickwork to deteriorate as well as moisture and mold issues. Another cause for the closure was financial difficulties. The Warner Theatre struggled to compete with the newer multiplexes in the area. The entrance was boarded up in 2014 after interior damage was caused by vandals.

== 2021 ownership transition and renewed restoration initiatives ==
On December 28, 2021, The Dominion Post published an article announcing that The Warner Theater had been purchased by Mark Downs and Rich Brant. The new owners plan to return the venue to a single-bay theater and use the theater to host live performances. Dan Coffey, known for his work on theater restorations in Chicago, has already visited the Warner.

Morgantown based construction firm March-Westin has been selected to perform the renovations. The theatre could reopen as early as 2025.
