= State Theatre (Kalamazoo, Michigan) =

Kalamazoo State Theatre
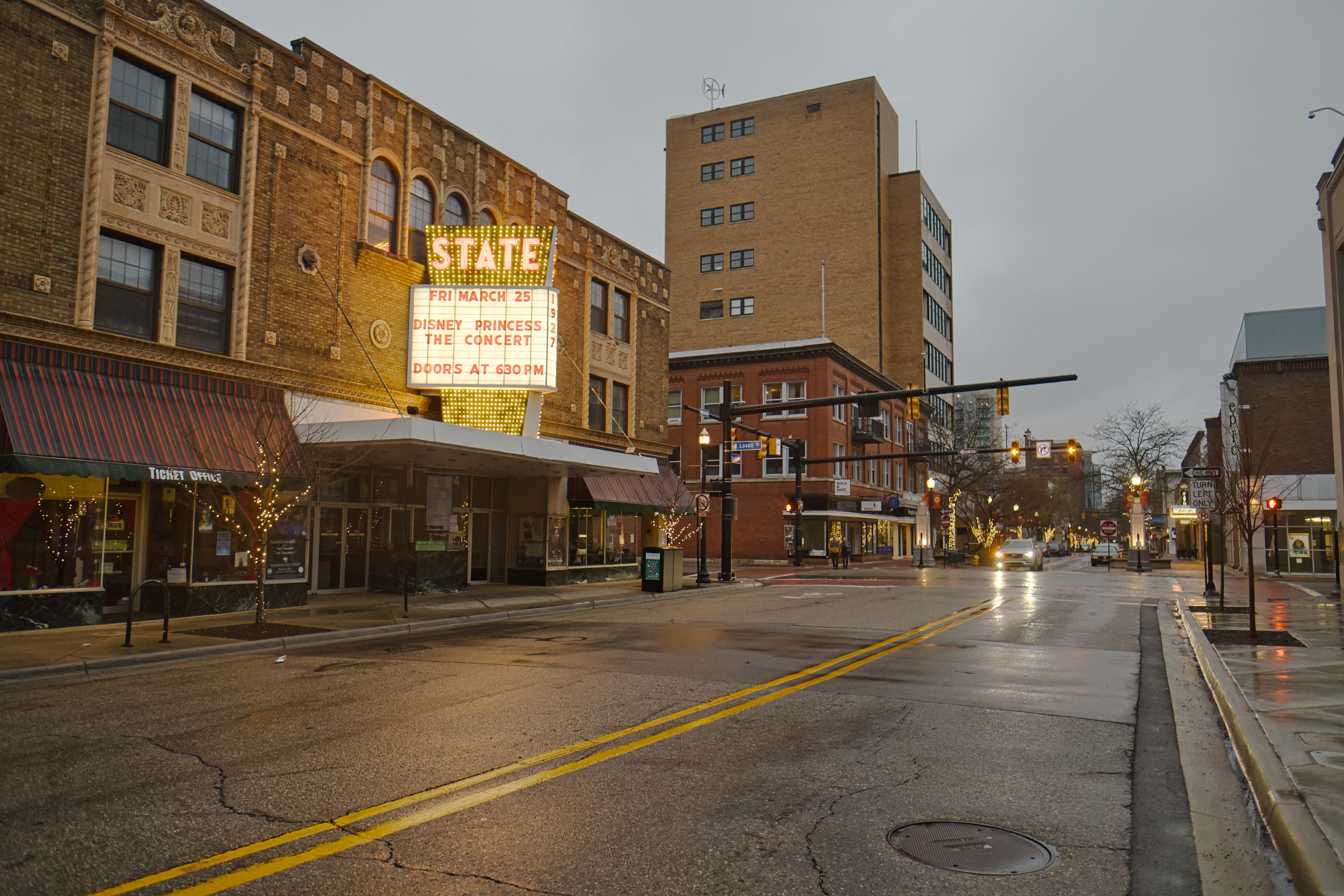
- Photographed in 2022
- Interactive map of Kalamazoo State Theatre
- Address: 404 S Burdick St; Kalamazoo, Michigan; United States
- Coordinates: 42.2883557°N 85.5832638°W
- Owner: Hinman Company
- Capacity: 1,590
- Current use: Live Performance Venue

Construction
- Opened: July 14, 1927
- Closed: 1982
- Reopened: 1985
- Architect: John Eberson

Website
- https://www.kazoostate.com/
- State Theatre
- U.S. National Register of Historic Places
- NRHP reference No.: 83004623
- Added to NRHP: November 17, 2021

The State Theatre is a Spanish-styled atmospheric theatre in Kalamazoo, Michigan, designed by renowned architect John Eberson. The State was built for W.S. Butterfield Theatres in 1927, and remains in operation today, presenting live shows. The theatre was listed on the National Register of Historic Places in 2021.

== Nationwide context ==
In the United States, the mid to late 1920s was a booming time for the film industry. With the growing power and vertical integration of major companies, between 1922 and 1930 the total investment in the film industry jumped from $78 million to $850 million. The average weekly attendance at American movie theatres doubled from 40 million in 1922 to 80 million in 1928. A key component to this growth was the creation of movie theatres. There was competition to provide a tremendous experience which led to the extravagant era of the Picture Palace. The term Picture Palace is used to describe the opulent style of theatre that seated thousands. The iconographic features of the exterior of the theatre were designed to make the front of the theatre a "show window" to invite customers to come see a performance. With fancy lobbies, uniformed ushers, musical accompaniments, and unique architecture these picture palaces were a unique draw that allowed a place where working and middle-class patrons could find luxury. Reflecting this national trend was Kalamazoo, a rising city during the twenties; due to the rapid increase in population it began to develop a need for a prominent theatre.

== Design and construction ==
The Kalamazoo State Theatre was built as a mid-sized picture palace in 1927 for the W.S. Butterfield Theatre chain. The State was constructed in 9 months at a cost of $350,000, equivalent to $6.5 million in 2025. Initially it was home to vaudeville shows, dance recitals, and silent films. The Kalamazoo State is an atmospheric theatre, employing a lit blue ceiling that evokes the night sky.

The theatre was designed by John Eberson, a renowned theatre architect out of Chicago, who was known for his style of atmospheric theatres. For the Kalamazoo State he employed a Spanish theme. Originally the State seated 1,300 people with the interior reflecting a beautiful Spanish courtyard. The ceiling is painted dark blue with twinkling electric stars, and moving clouds which are projected across it to create an outdoor atmosphere. The auditorium, lobby, and mezzanine are decorated in a Mediterranean color scheme with pottery, furniture, wrought iron, statues, and paintings. Outside they utilize buff-colored tapestry, brick, and ornate terra-cotta accents.

== Barton Theatre Organ ==
The State is home to its original Barton theatre organ, which accompanied silent pictures from 1927 to 1937. The introduction of talkies ended the use of the organ until 1950, but by 1961 it was fully restored and put back into service. The organ is still used for special presentations, but its condition is noted by the American Theatre Organ Society as "in need of restoration."

Silent films always had musical accompaniment. In the large picture palaces, such as those in Chicago and Detroit, they would typically have a live orchestra. The smaller palaces, such as the Kalamazoo State Theatre, would have had a chamber group or pipe organ. This was a great improvement from the small town and second run houses which would typically only offer a piano player.

== Decline and rehabilitation ==
In 1964, the theatre underwent drastic modernization. Due to age-induced damage, the original 45-foot vertical sign on the corner was replaced with a horizontal marquee over the box-office. The interior was stripped of some of its original decor.

W.S. Butterfield Theatres closed the State in 1982. The closing of such a historic part of Kalamazoo began to mobilize community members. Efforts to save the theatre from a tragic end were pursued by several local entrepreneurs and preservationists. Local arts groups and city officials formed the "Save the State" committee in an effort to preserve the theatre's legacy along with the building.

The solution came when the building was purchased in 1985 by the Hinman Company. The purchase brought about further renovation and worked to preserve a part of Kalamazoo's history. Recent preservation efforts have helped to restore the original splendor of the State. After years of uncertainty, Kalamazoo's State Theatre has survived to attract a wide variety of performers. It is one of the few remaining atmospheric movie palaces in the United States.

== Programming ==
The State currently is the premier live performance venue in Kalamazoo, hosting performances by the likes of Lewis Black, Kid Cudi, and other popular entertainers.

The Kalamazoo State Theatre is a member of the League of Historic American Theatres (LHAT), an organization that champions the restoration, preservation and ongoing operations of North America's treasured venues.

The Kalamazoo State Theatre closed its doors in November of 2024.

== See also ==
- Atmospheric theater
- John Eberson
