= Grand Riviera Theater =

Former historic place in Michigan, United States

- Formerly listed on the U.S. National Register of Historic Places
- Michigan State Historic Site
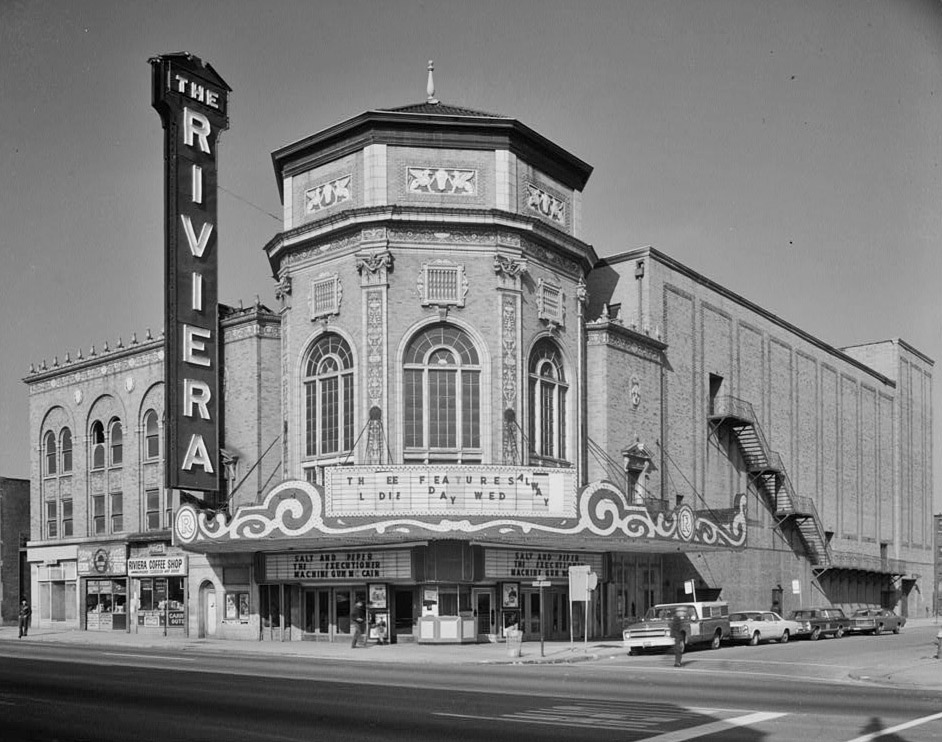
- Grand Riviera in 1970
- Interactive map
- Location: 9222 Grand River Avenue; Detroit, Michigan
- Coordinates: 42°21′58″N 83°7′51″W
- Built: 1925
- Architect: John Eberson
- Architectural style: Italian Renaissance Revival, Mediterranean Revival
- Demolished: June 1996
- NRHP reference No.: 82002901

Significant dates
- Added to NRHP: April 22, 1982
- Designated MSHS: October 2, 1980
- Removed from NRHP: June 10, 2020

The Grand Riviera Theater was a movie palace theater located at 9222 Grand River Avenue in western Detroit, Michigan. It took its name from Grand River Avenue. It was designated a Michigan State Historic Site in 1980, and listed on the National Register of Historic Places in 1982, but was subsequently demolished in June, 1996. The building was removed from the National Register in 2020.

== History ==
The Grand Riviera cinema was built in 1925, at a cost of over one million dollars. It seated over 3000, and was the first "atmospheric" theater in Detroit, using lighting, special effects, and interior design to make the audience feel like they were sitting outdoors in a garden.

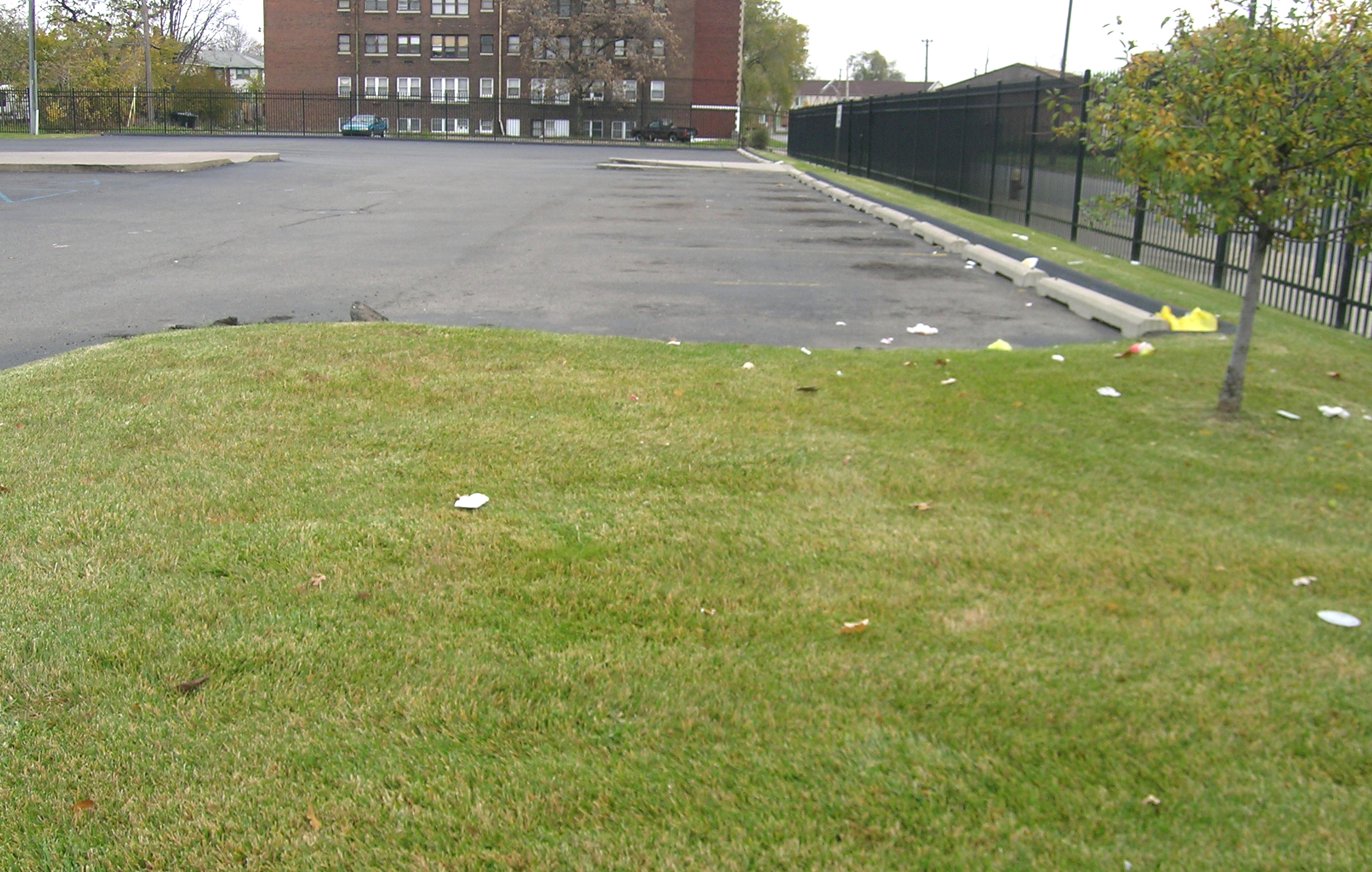
Empty lot where cinema formerly stood

The theater was immediately successful, and in 1927 an 1,800 seat annex was built. In 1957, the Riviera was converted to a stage theater. When the Fisher Theater reopened in 1960, however, the Grand Riviera took a back seat. The building was used for music concerts until it closed in the mid-1970s. Afterward, the structure deteriorated, to the point that it was considered unsafe and demolished in 1996.

== Description ==
The Grand Riviera Theater was a three-story structure built from brown brick in an Italian Renaissance Revival and Mediterranean Revival style. An 80-foot-tall (24 m) octagonal pavilion sat on the corner of the structure. The pavilion had arched, multi-paned windows and substantial cream terra cotta decoration.

To the west of the pavilion was the three-story wing with commercial and office space. To the north was the auditorium section which was built with windowless paneled brick walls.

The interior design and decorations of the Grand Riviera were very ornate. The original "atmospheric" interior elements included a simulated courtyard, a dark blue ceiling with inset electric "stars" and projected moving clouds, and walls with artificial trees and vines.

== Gallery: Images from 1970 ==
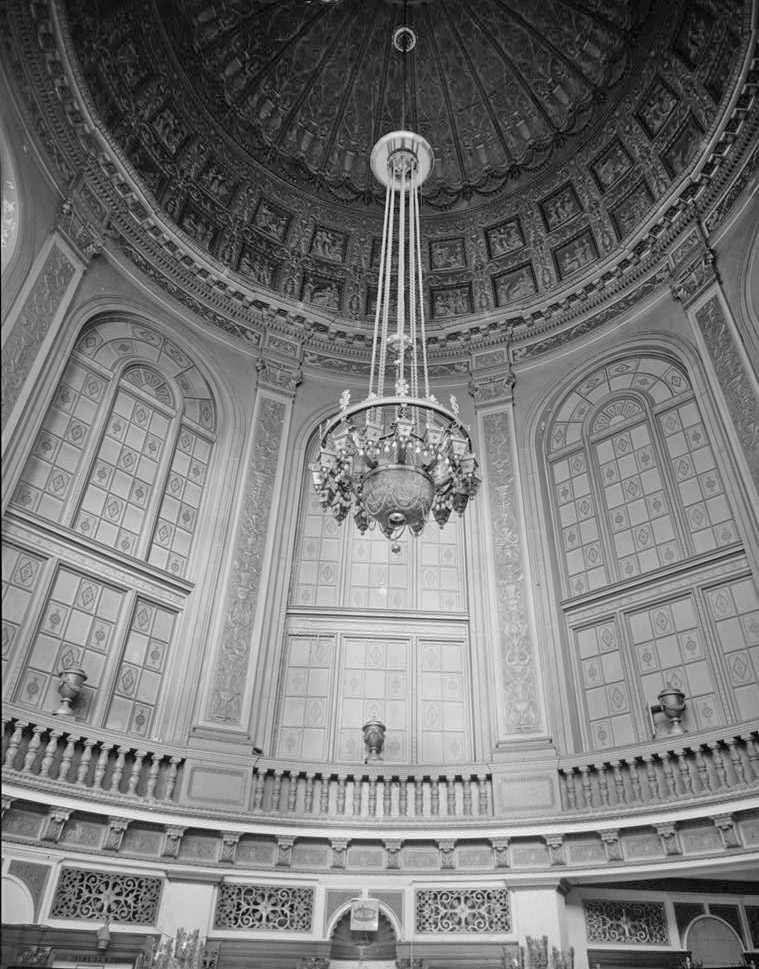
Rotunda

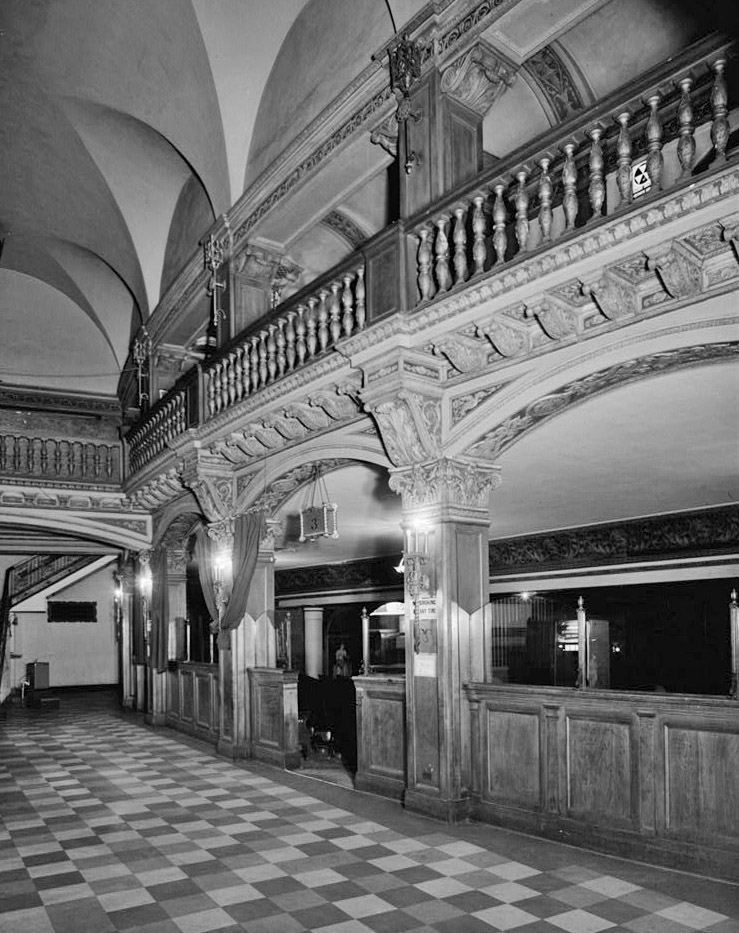
Foyer

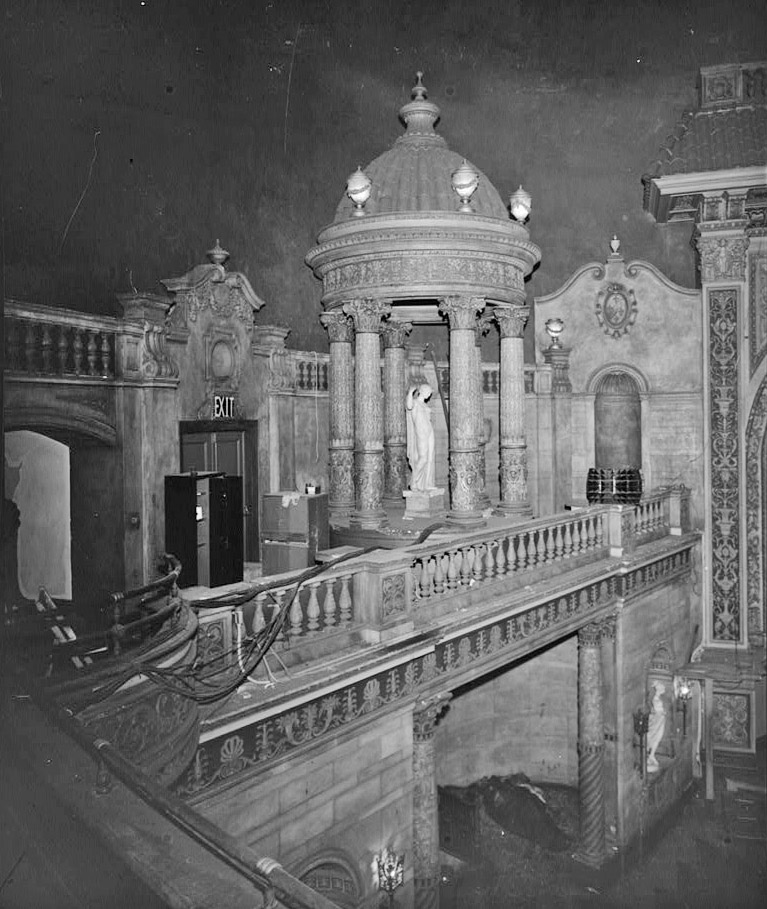
Auditorium

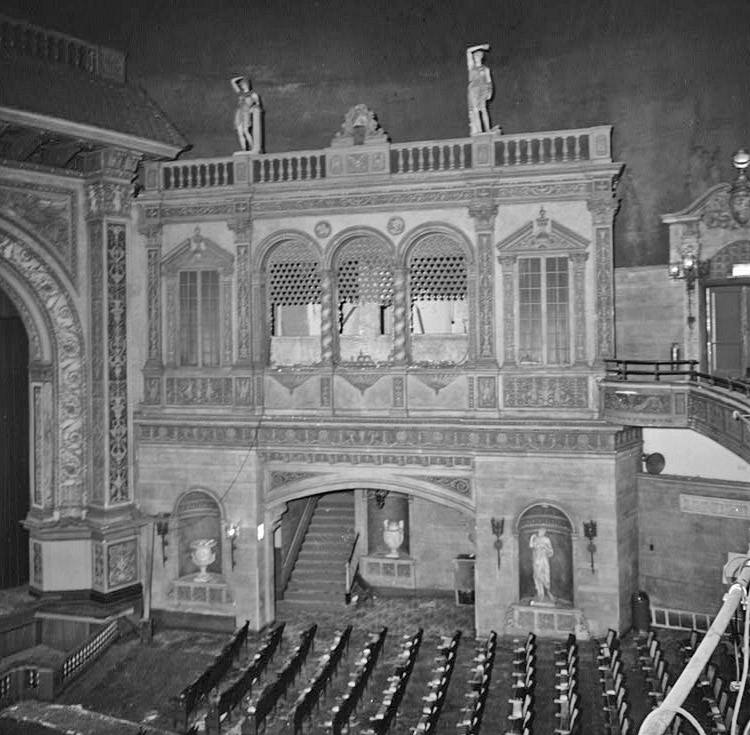
Auditorium
