= Bethesda Theatre =

United States historic place in Bethesda, Maryland

- U.S. National Register of Historic Places
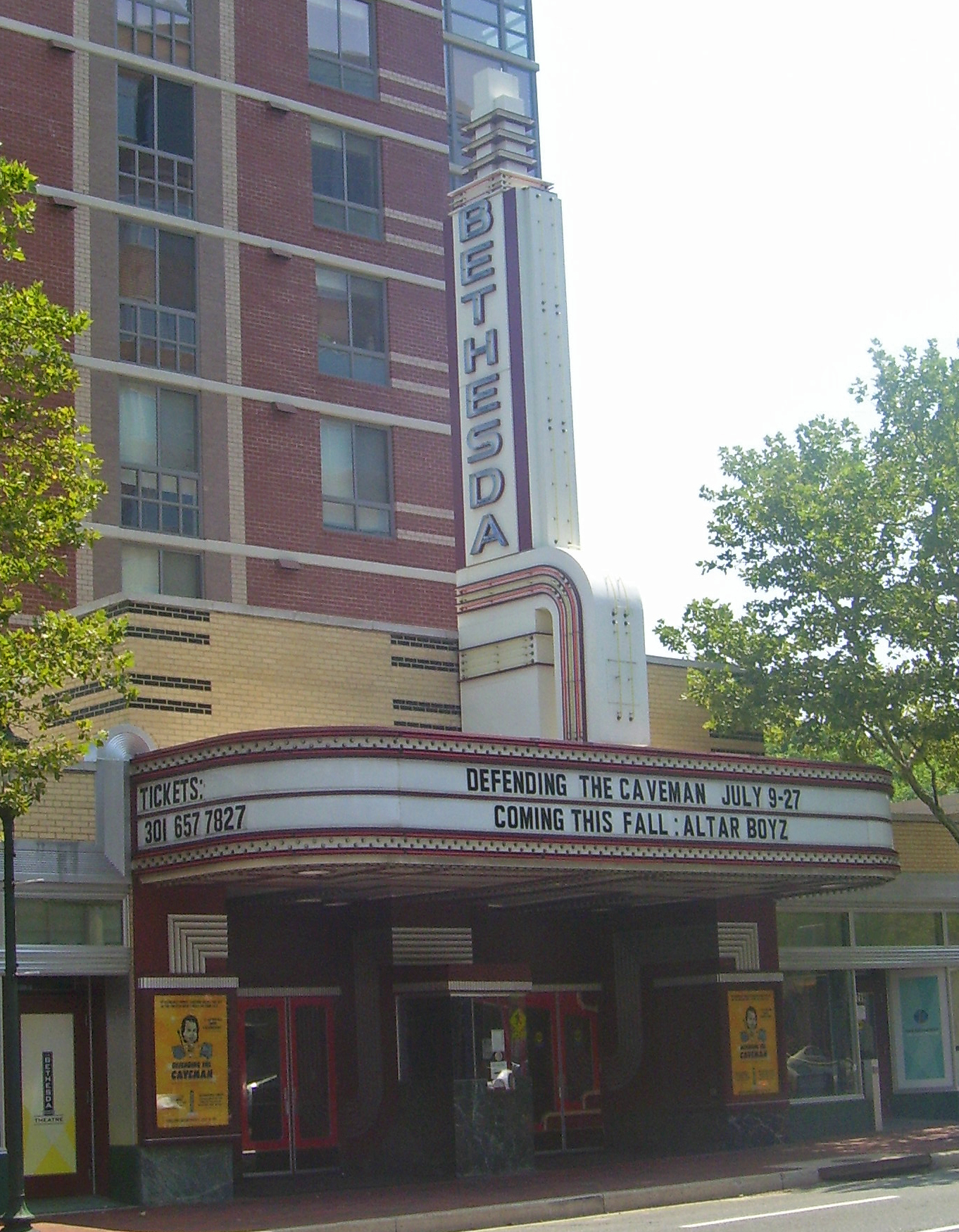
- Front elevation and marquee, 2008

- Location within Maryland Location within the United States
- Location: 7719 Wisconsin Ave., Bethesda, Maryland
- Coordinates: 38°59′14.1″N 77°5′40.7″W
- Area: 0.4 acres (0.16 ha)
- Built: 1938
- Architects: Eberson, John; Woodmont Development Co.
- Architectural style: Art Deco
- NRHP reference No.: 99000133
- Added to NRHP: February 5, 1999

The Bethesda Theatre, constructed in 1938, is a historic Streamline Moderne movie theater located at 7719 Wisconsin Avenue (MD 355), Bethesda, Maryland, United States. It is a multi-level building composed of rectangular blocks: an auditorium block and a lower street-front lobby and entrance block, including shops. The theatre retains its original configuration of lobby, foyer, lounges, and auditorium. Many original interior finishes, including painted murals, remain intact, with the exception of the original seating. It was designed by the firm of the world-renowned "Dean of American Theatre Architects," John Eberson.

In 1983 it re-opened as the "Bethesda Cinema and Drafthouse" showing movies on a single screen and serving food and beer. In 1990 it changed its name to the "Bethesda Theatre Cafe". In 2007, under the leadership of Executive Director Ray Cullom, it underwent a major renovation and became a venue for theatrical productions. Cullom produced well-received DC-premiers of “I Love You, You’re Perfect, Now Change”, the hit musical “Altar Boyz”, Smokey Joe's Cafe” and brought over several innovative productions from the Edinburgh Fringe Festival. In 2009, the theatre was forced to shut down after a severe water leak in the building directly above the auditorium and technical control booths caused the landmarked Art Deco ceiling to fall in, and rendered the theatre uninhabitable. The theatre was auctioned off on June 29, 2010, and reopened in 2013 as the Bethesda Blues & Jazz Supper Club.

It was listed on the National Register of Historic Places in 1999.
