= Palace Theatre (Louisville, Kentucky) =

Music venue in Louisville, Kentucky

- Louisville Palace
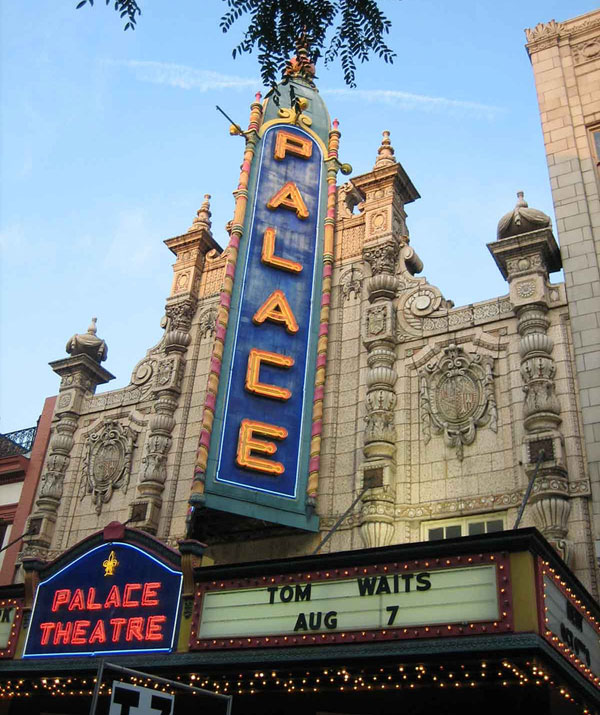
- Exterior of venue (c.2006)
- Interactive map of Palace Theatre
- Former names: Loew's Theatre (1928–48); Loew's United Artist Theatre (1948–54); United Artists Theatre (1954–78)
- Address: 625 S 4th St; Louisville, KY 40202-2403
- Location: Downtown Louisville
- Coordinates: 38°14′51.65″N 85°45′27.62″W
- Owner: Live Nation
- Capacity: 2,800

Construction
- Opened: September 1, 1928
- Closed: 1985-94

Website
- Venue Website
- Loew's and United Artists State Theatre
- U.S. National Register of Historic Places
- Built: 1927
- Architect: John Eberson
- NRHP reference No.: 78001361
- Added to NRHP: March 28, 1978

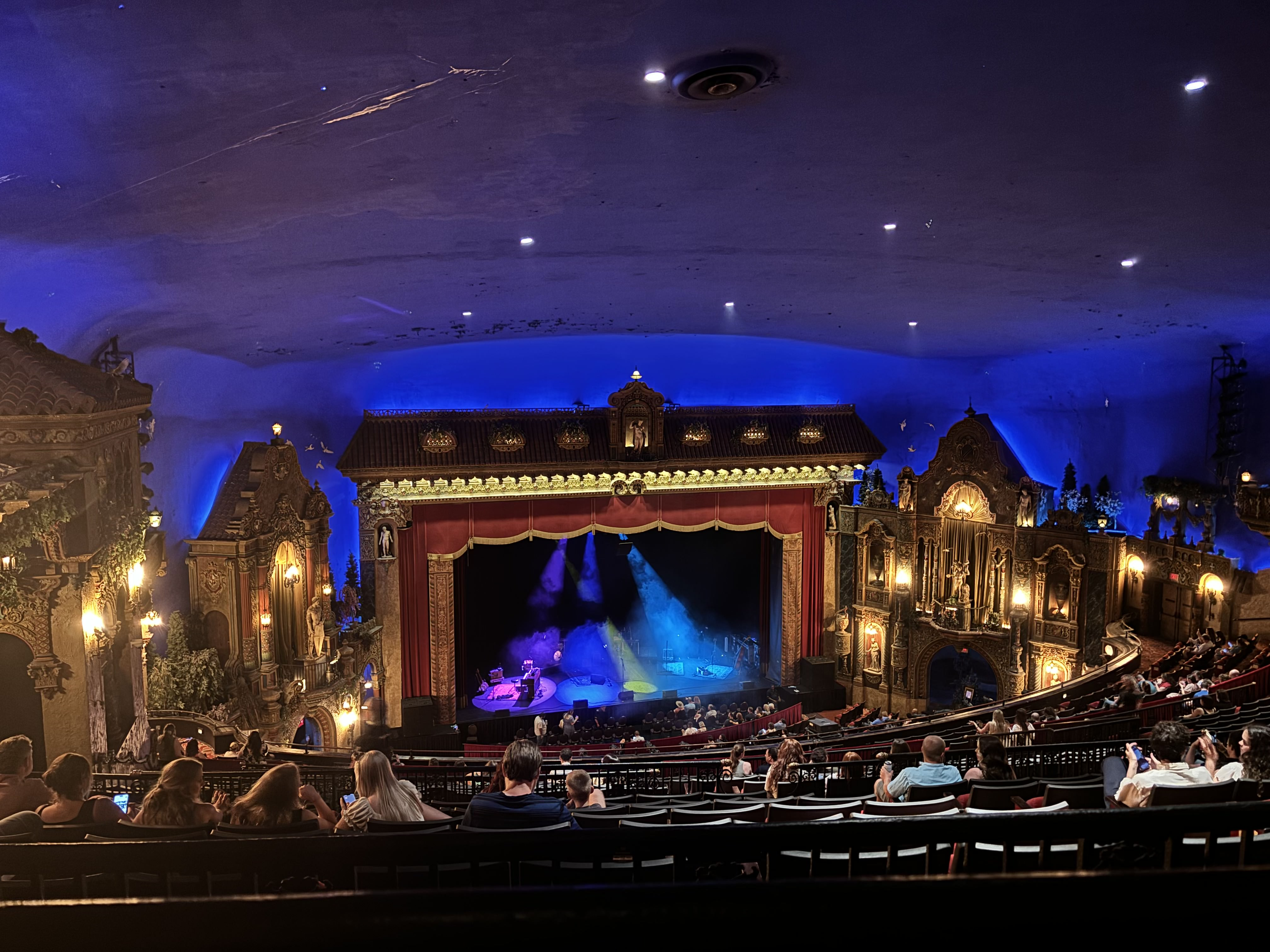
Theatre interior before a Gregory Alan Isakov concert in June 2024

The Palace Theatre (previously known as the Loew's Theatre, Loew's United Artist Theatre and the United Artists Theatre; locally known as the Louisville Palace) is a music venue in downtown Louisville, Kentucky, located in the city's theater district, on the east side of Fourth Street, between Broadway and Chestnut Street. It has a seating capacity of 2,711 people and is owned by Live Nation. The historic landmark opened on September 1, 1928, and was designed by architect John Eberson.

== Architecture ==
The Palace exhibits a Spanish Baroque motif and is decorated in bright colors, particularly deep red and cobalt blue. Terrazzo is used for the lobby flooring and as accents on the grand staircase. Above is a curved, vaulted ceiling with 139 sculptures of the faces of 12 historical figures—Apollo, Bach, Beethoven, Dante, Handel, Listz, Molière, Mozart, Schubert, Shakespeare, Socrates and Wagner—plus Eberson and John Siegel (a local businessman who restored the theater for the 1981 reopening).

The theater room inside The Palace is heavily ornamented and displays an imitation nighttime sky on the ceiling. Architectural facades surround the two-story seating area.

The theater is two stories with a floor and a balcony. Both floors contain bars that run the width of the building behind the theater, separated by a grand lobby of intricate art and architecture.

== History ==
The theater was designed by John Eberson in his atmospheric theater style. It opened as Loew's Theater on September 1, 1928, with seating for 3273 people. At that time, it was the largest movie theater in Kentucky and one of the largest in the South. The initial cost was more than two million dollars.

It closed for a portion of the 1970s and reopened in 1981 as a live performance venue. In 1982, it was added to the National Register of Historic Places. However, the cost of renovations led it to close again in 1985. The theater changed hands several times in the late twentieth and early twenty-first century.

== See also ==
- List of attractions and events in the Louisville metropolitan area
- List of concert halls
- House of Blues
