= Hippodrome Theatre (Terre Haute, Indiana) =

- U.S. National Register of Historic Places
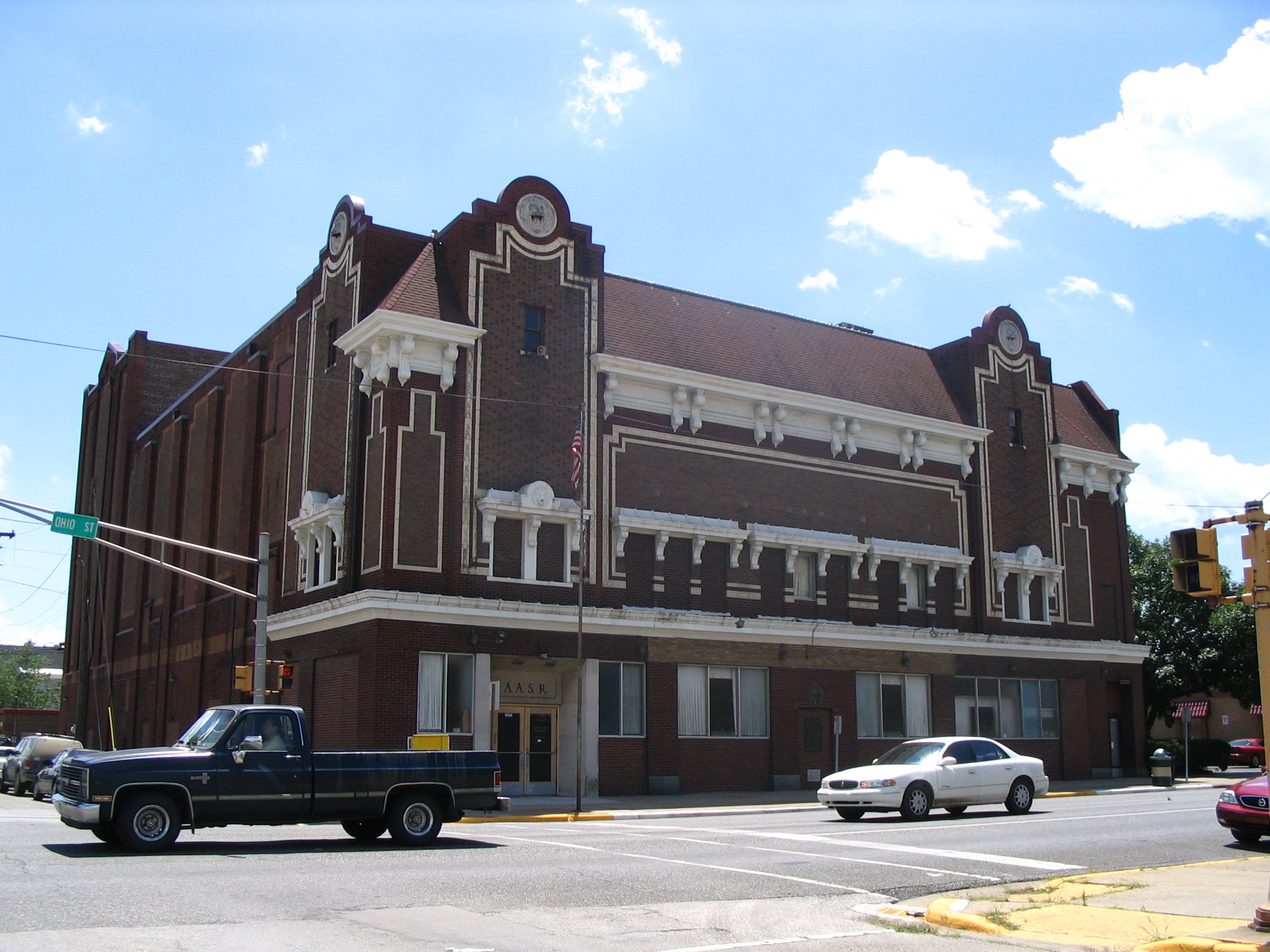

- Location within Vigo County, Indiana Location within Indiana Location within the United States
- Location: 727 Ohio St, Terre Haute, Indiana; United States
- Coordinates: 39°27′55″N 87°24′21″W
- Built: 1915
- Architect: John Eberson
- Architectural style: German Renaissance
- NRHP reference No.: 83000110
- Added to NRHP: June 30, 1983

The Hippodrome Theatre or Wabash Theatre is a historic theater in Terre Haute, Indiana, USA.

Theater manager Theodore W. Barhydt decided to build a theater in the area and enlisted the help of noted theater architect John Eberson to design the building. The German Renaissance structure officially opened on February 15, 1915, with a grand opening celebration attended by local dignitaries such as Indiana governor Samuel M. Ralston and vaudeville moguls like Joseph M. Finn, Marcus Heiman, and Asher Levy.

The building was placed on the National Register of Historic Places in 1983.
