= History of cinema in the United States =

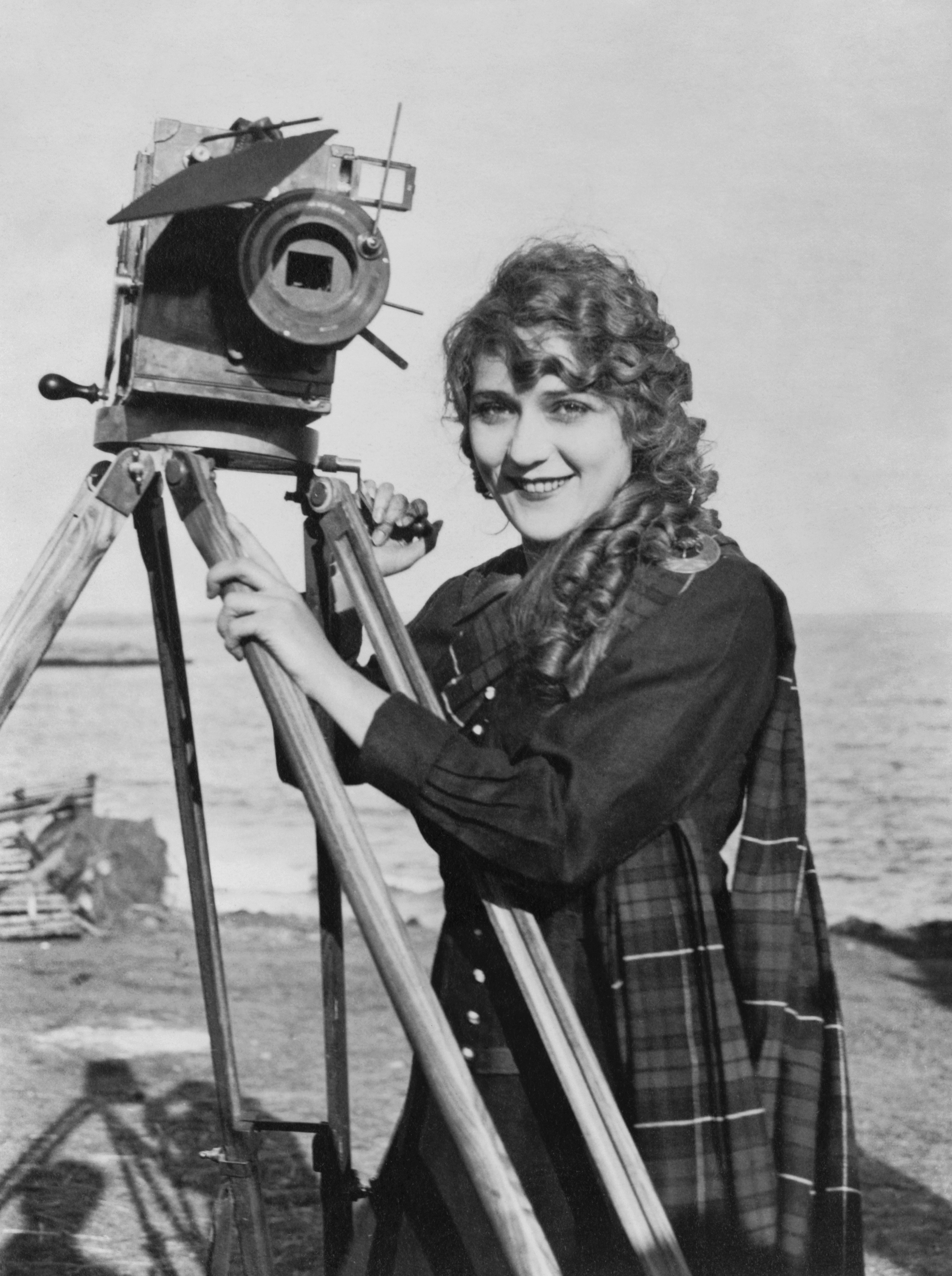
Silent film actress Mary Pickford, c. 1916

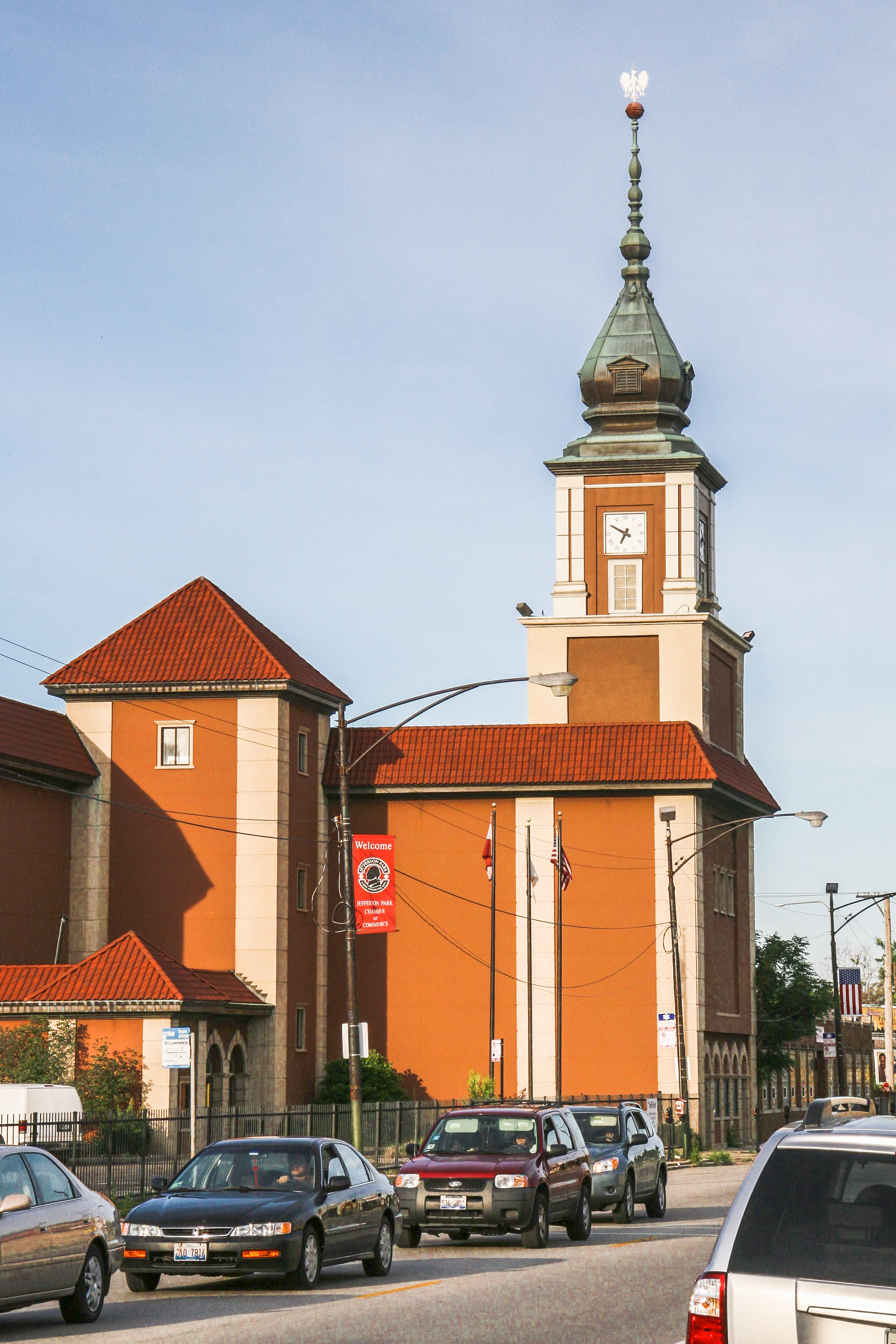
The Gateway Theatre in Jefferson Park, Chicago was a movie palace for the Balaban and Katz theater chain. The theater's Baroque spire is a replica of the Royal Castle in Warsaw.

This article delineates the history of cinema in the United States.

== Before 1900 ==
In 1893, Eadweard Muybridge projected hand-painted animated images at his Zoopraxigraphical Hall at the World's Columbian Exposition in Chicago.

The prototype kinetograph camera and kinetoscope viewer were exhibited on May 20, 1891 by Thomas Edison for a convention of the National Federation of Women's Clubs, patent filed August 24, 1891, and on May 9, 1893 a public exhibition of the Edison Kinetoscope was held at the Brooklyn Institute of Arts and Sciences.

Charles Francis Jenkins developed the Phantoscope, and with his new partner Thomas Armat modified the Phantoscope for exhibitions in temporary theaters at the Cotton States and International Exposition in the fall of 1895. The Phantoscope was later sold to Thomas Edison, who changed the name of the projector to Edison's Vitascope. With the Vitascope, Edison began public showings of his films at Koster and Bial's Music Hall on 34th Street in New York City on April 23, 1896. However, the first "storefront theater" in the US dedicated exclusively to showing motion pictures was Vitascope Hall, established on Canal Street, New Orleans, Louisiana July 26, 1896—it was converted from a vacant store.

A crucial factor was Edison's decision to sell a small number of Vitascope projectors as a business venture in April–May 1896. In the basement of the new Ellicott Square Building, Main Street, Buffalo, New York, Mitchel H. Mark and his brother Moe Mark added what they called Edison's Vitascope Theater (entered through Edisonia Hall), which they opened to the general public on October 19, 1896, in collaboration with Rudolf Wagner, who had moved to Buffalo after spending several years working at the Edison laboratories. This 72-seat plush theater was designed from scratch solely to show motion pictures.

This Vitascope Theater was noted as "one of the earliest permanently located and exclusively motion picture exhibitions." According to the Buffalo News (Wednesday, November 2, 1932), "There were seats for about 90 people [actually 72] and the admission was three cents. Feeble, flickering films of travel scenes were the usual fare." The theater remained open for two years, making it the first permanent movie theater in the world.

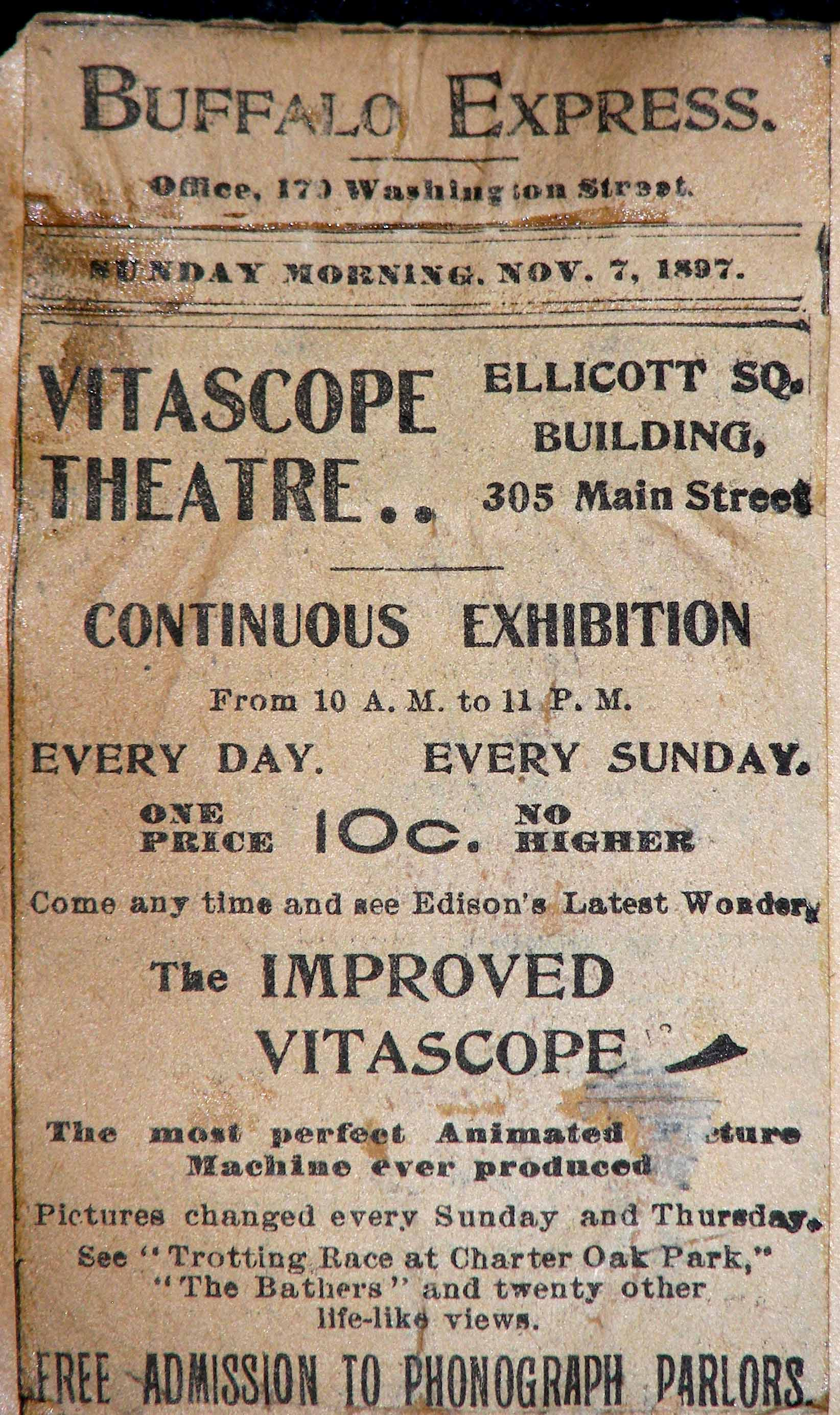
November 7, 1897 ad for the Vitascope Theater in Buffalo, New York, one of the first theaters created especially to show motion pictures. In its first year there were 200,000 admissions.

== 1900–1919 ==
The first permanent motion picture theater in the state of California was Tally's Electric Theater, completed in 1902 in Los Angeles. Tally's theater was in a storefront in a larger building. The Great Train Robbery (1903), which was 12 minutes in length, would also give the film industry a boost.

In 1905, John P. Harris and Harry Davis opened a five-cents-admission movie theater in a Pittsburgh storefront, naming it the Nickelodeon and setting the style for the first common type of movie theater. By 1908, there were thousands of storefront Nickelodeons, Gems and Bijous across North America. A few theaters from the nickelodeon era are still showing films today.

The 1913 opening of the Regent Theater in New York City signaled a new respectability for the medium, and the start of the two-decade heyday of American cinema design. The million dollar Mark Strand Theatre at 47th Street and Broadway in New York City opened in 1914 by Mitchell Mark was the archetypical movie palace. The ornate Al. Ringling Theatre was built in Baraboo, WI by Al Ringling, one of the founders of the Ringling Bros. Circus, for the then-incredible sum of $100,000. Los Angeles showman Sid Grauman continued the trend of theater-as-destination with his ornate "Million Dollar Theater", using the same design firm as Ringling. It opened on Broadway in downtown Los Angeles in 1918.

In 1915, the tremendous success of The Birth of a Nation helped to establish the popularity of feature films, which forced the owners of five-cent theaters to increase the ticket price to ten cents or more, then either remodel to provide a more comfortable and pleasant environment or relocate to a bigger and better auditorium, bringing the nickelodeon era to an end.

During those two decades, more than 50% of the country's market was held by the French group Pathé (particularly with its subsidiary Pathé Exchange). After the First World War, the Pathé group gradually withdrew from the United States market due to financial difficulties related to the war and the rapid rise of Hollywood. In addition to having marked the period with its film productions, Pathé is also known for having invented among other the world's first filmed newsreel, named Pathé News (Pathé Journal in France). Pathé no longer has operations in America but is still currently one of the main French and European film groups.

== Post 1920s: the modern era ==
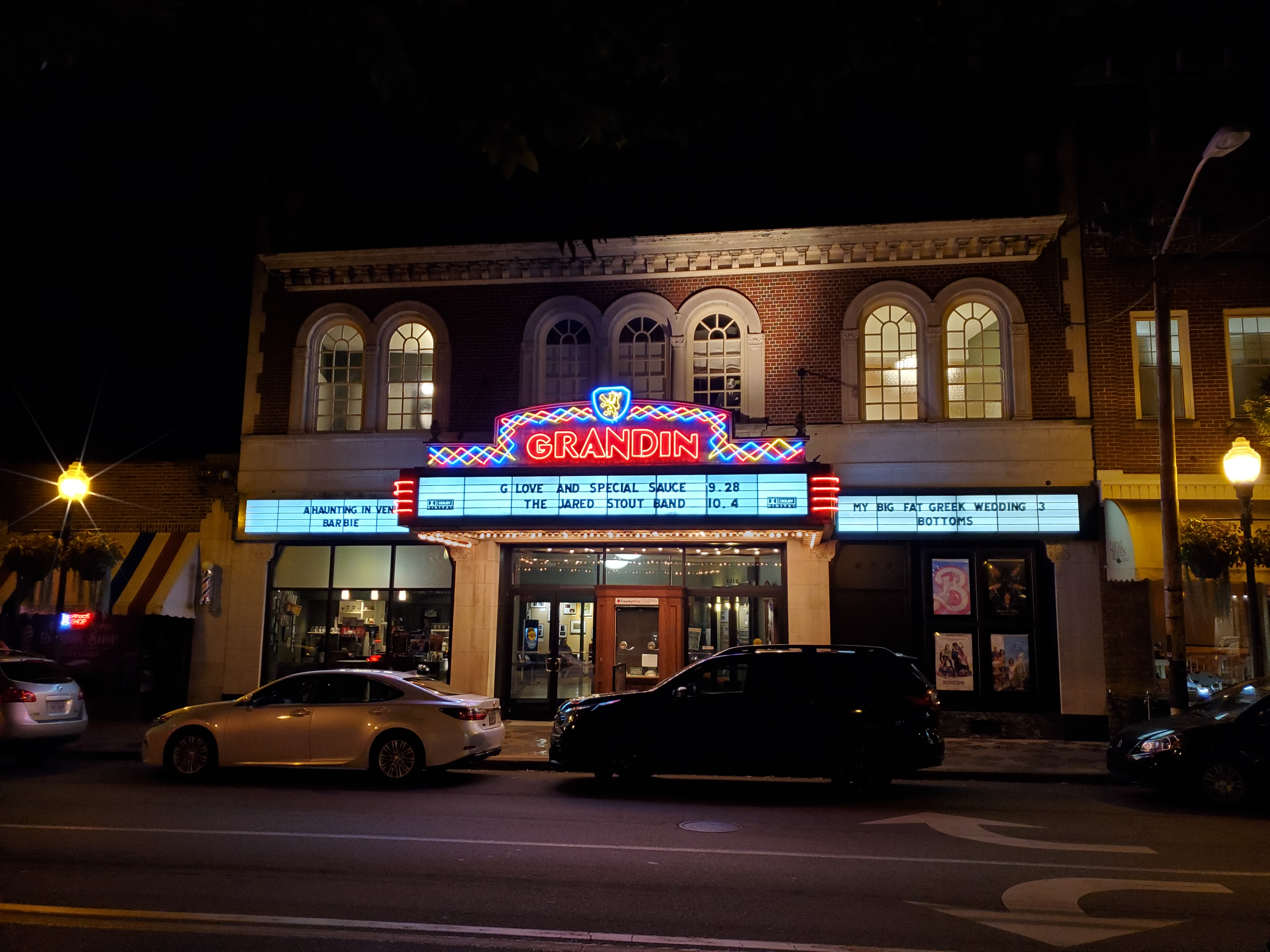
The Grandin Theatre (at night), an independent movie theater in the Grandin Village district of Roanoke, Virginia, established in 1932.

The start of the 1920s marked the impending end of the Silent Comedy genre that lasted roughly three decades. Though silent comedies remained prominent within America cinema with the likes of Buster Keaton´s talents with his films such as Sherlock Jr (1924), which was one of the first films to show that the talents of the actor and director (In Buster Keaton's case he was both!) can carry a film with passion and daring stunts often appreciated in the theatrical world American cinema even in today's filming era.

By the late 1920s, ¨Talking Pictures¨ (or ¨Talkies¨) became American cinemas introduction to synchronized sound. The release of The Jazz Singer (1927) was a major turning point, as audiences flocked to see and hear the new technology. The successful introduction of synchronized sound was a massive technological and cultural shift that rendered silent films obsolete and led studios to quickly transition to producing "Talkies" to stay profitable.

In the next several years, as movie revenues exploded, independent promoters and movie studios (who owned their own proprietary chains until an antitrust ruling in 1948) raced to build the most lavish, elaborate, attractive theaters.

These forms morphed into a unique architectural genre—the movie palace—a unique and extreme architectural genre which boasted a luxurious design, a giant screen, and, beginning in 1953, stereophonic sound. The movie chains were also among the first industries to install air conditioning systems which gave the theaters an additional lure of comfort in the summer period. In 1931, a seat with a pivoted back was designed to allow people to remain seated while other patrons easily passed in front of them. This type of seat became standard in almost every American movie theaters.

Several movie studios achieved vertical integration by acquiring and constructing theater chains. The so-called "Big Five" theater chains of the 1920s and 1930s were all owned by studios: Paramount, Warner, Loews (which owned Metro-Goldwyn-Mayer), Fox, and RKO. All were broken up as a result of the U.S. Supreme Court's ruling in the 1948 United States v. Paramount Pictures, Inc. anti-trust case.

In the 1970s, "adult movie theaters" became ubiquitous in some areas. However, the introduction of the low-cost VHS video system for home televisions has decommissioned many porno cinemas as well as many 'second-run' theaters.

People can pay to watch movies at home after a few short months following their theatrical release, through cable television or streaming media: pay-per-view (PPV) and video on demand (VOD). Initially, home video contributed to an industry wide slump in the late 1980s (see disruptive technology), not to mention the decline of the 'Dollar Cinema' (where first-run films are pulled from circulation to play at reduced rates for the remainder of their run). The theater industry responded by building larger auditoriums with stadium seating layouts, installing more screens (to allow for more variety and more show times), upgrading sound systems and installing more amenities and higher-quality food and drink. The growing popularity of high-definition television sets, along with HD DVD and Blu-ray Disc players may also contribute to the decline in cinema attendance, although there seems to be little evidence of this at the moment.

== Movie theater culture in United States ==
Movie theaters are associated with dating, popcorn and expensive treats.

=== Intimacy ===
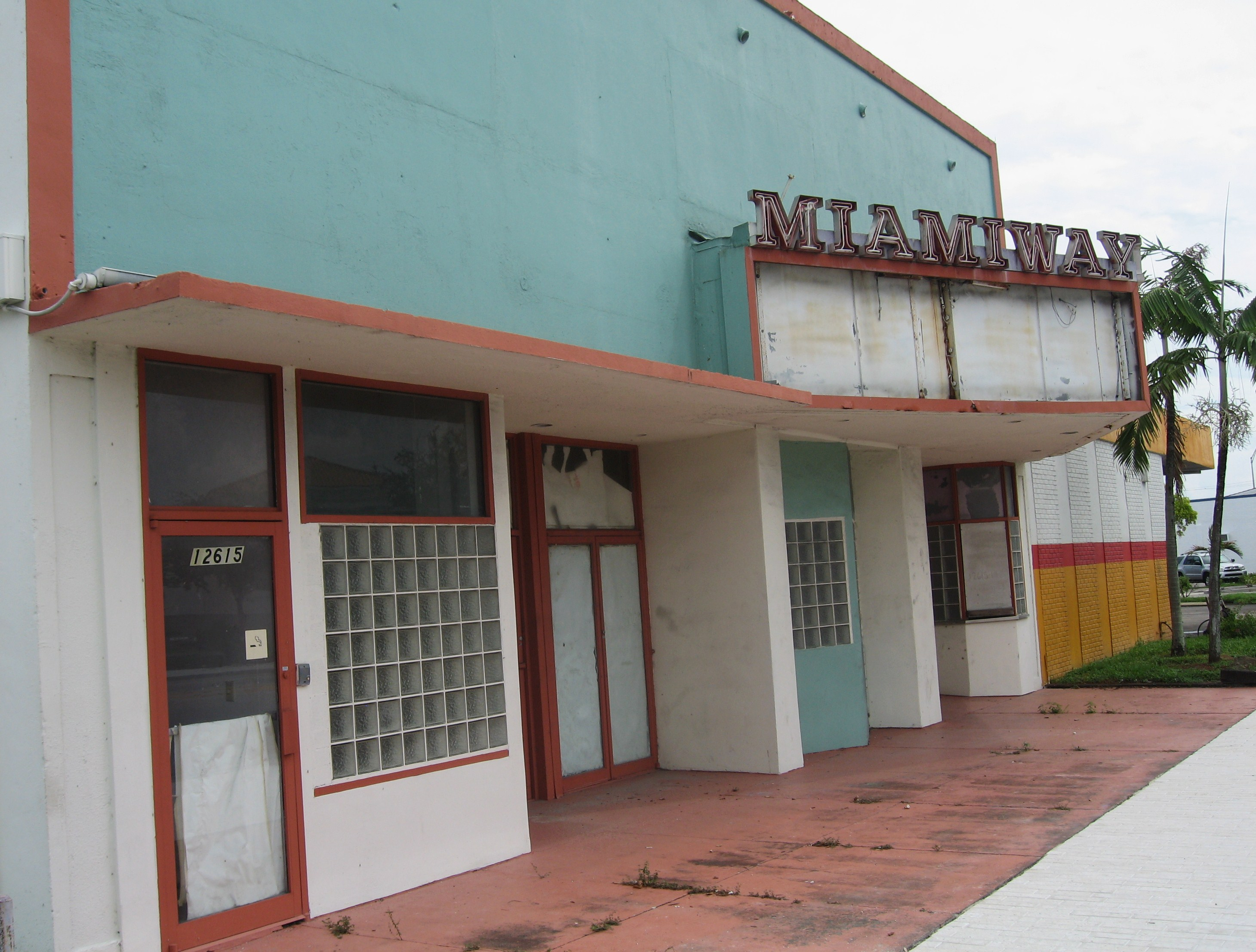
Abandoned theater in North Miami, Florida

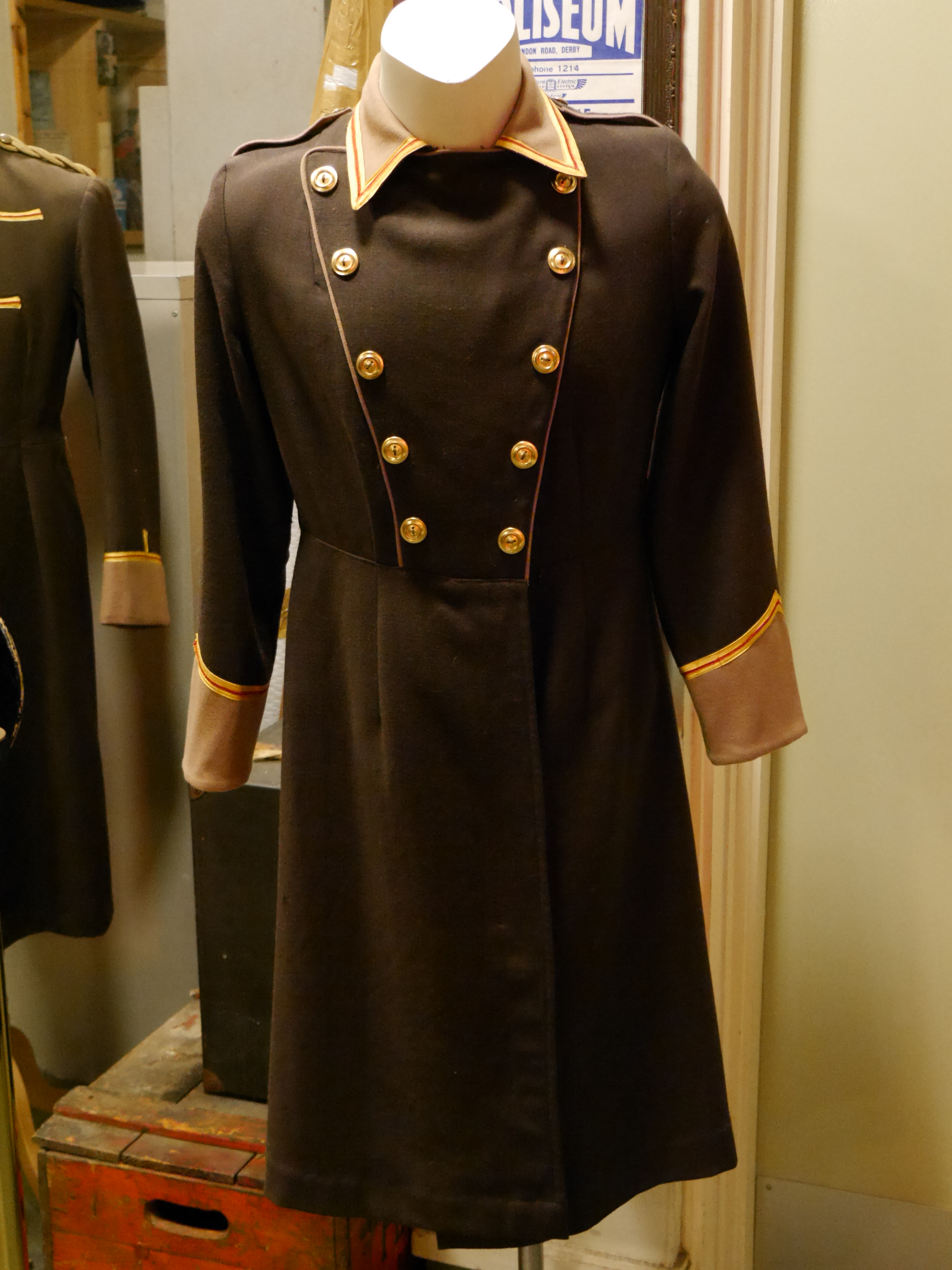
Usher's uniform, Cinema Museum (London)

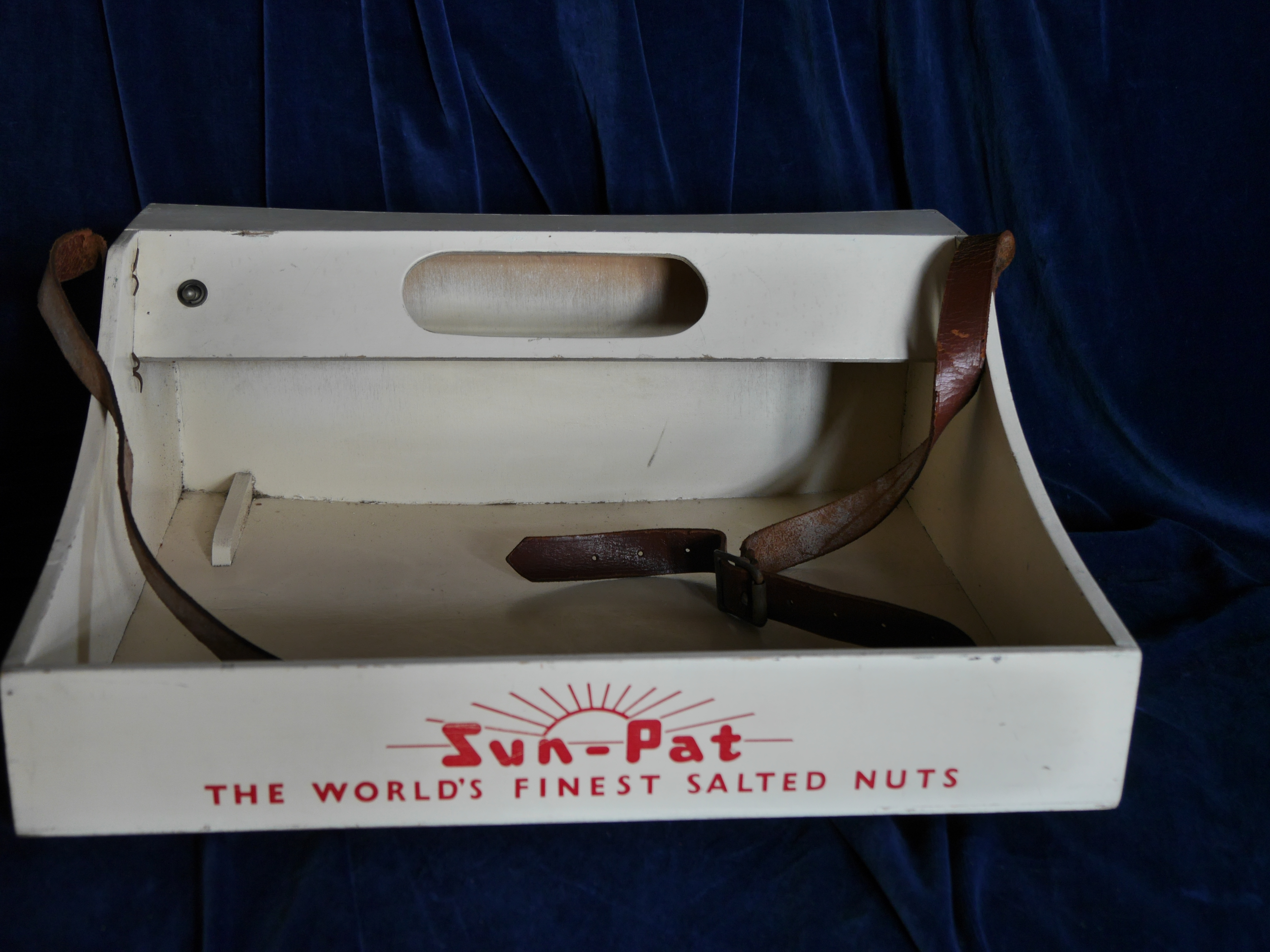
An usherette tray for selling snacks

Sometimes couples go to a movie theater for the additional reason that it provides the possibility of intimacy, where the dark provides some privacy (with additional privacy in the back-row). This kind of intimacy is considered by some a lesser form of public display of affection. Compared with being together in a room without other people, it may also be reassuring for one or both of the couple (and for parents) that the intimacy is necessarily limited.

Arm rests pose a hindrance to intimacy for some people. Some theaters have love seats: seats for two without an armrest in the middle. The most modern theaters have movable armrests throughout the theater that when down can hold a food container as well as act as an armrest or partition between the seats and when up allow closer contact between the couple. Some theaters such as the Parkway in Oakland, California have sofas for greater comfort.

=== Foyer area, food and drinks ===
Movie theaters usually sell various snack foods and drinks at retail counters or kiosks. Sometimes it can be a self-service where one pays at the counter till, and/or a coin-operated machine. Sometimes the area of sale is more like a self-service shop or kiosk (it is not suitable for consuming the goods), and one pays at the check-out between the shop and the area with the screens. Foods usually served at movie theaters include popcorn, soft drinks, nachos, hot dogs, ice creams and a wide range of confectionery. At most theaters, people are allowed to select their own sweets (known as "pick and mix".)

The concessions for buying snacks and drinks often represent the theater's primary source of profit (snacks make up 20% of revenue but 40% of profits in the United States theaters, with a box of popcorn generating a profit of 85%) since most of the ticket revenue goes to the film distributor (and onward to the movie studio). Bringing one's own food and drinks may be forbidden (although not always strictly enforced) in order to maintain a captive market, so theaters charge prices often threefold or higher than nearby stores, while popcorn has been marked up 900% according to CNN. Some movie theaters forbid eating and drinking inside the viewing room (restricting such activities to the foyer), while others encourage it by fitting cup holders on the arm rests (on the front side of the arm rests of one's own chair, or the back side of the arm rests in front) and selling large portions of popcorn and soft drinks. According to a report by Time magazine, "Theaters, it's been said, are really in the popcorn and candy business. The showing of films is just an excuse to gather a crowd and try to sell them buttery snacks and sugary drinks." This is not a new perspective on the financial importance of food and theaters. Retail is currently a huge area of expansion with many companies in the U.S. offering a wider range of snacks, including hot dogs and nachos. Some movie theaters feature a wider selection than simply snacks and popcorn. These "dine-in" theaters allow patrons to purchase "meals" (ranging from pizza slices to hamburgers and more) that can be consumed while watching the movie. Many theaters have embraced the "brew and view" concept, serving alcoholic beverages, in addition to snacks and popcorn. Some movie theaters such as the Living Room Theaters or Alamo Drafthouse offer full restaurant service at one's seat, though this is not as widespread. McMenamins is a chain of restaurant/brewpub establishments in the U.S. states of Oregon and Washington, many of which have full movie theaters. By the mid-1940s in some smaller theaters popcorn alone was paying the overheads, even sometimes bringing in more revenue than ticket sales. One theater company in Kansas City had about 4000 acres producing popcorn, and an unnamed person commented "Find a good popcorn location and build a theater around it."

The health benefits of this cinema food are generally low, and have been debated for years. Owner of Sony Pictures, Michael Lynton, has been one of the chief arguers over this, and has wanted cinemas worldwide to stop providing this junk food and instead provide healthier alternatives, like crudités, smoothies, nuts, granola bars and additive-free air-popped popcorn.

=== Altercations ===
Patrons are typically angered by cellphone use, talking, and other disturbances during the viewing. Although violence in American movie theaters is uncommon, there have been several notable cases of violence that occurred in movie theaters.

In 1989, screenings of Harlem Nights across the country lead to gunfire and fistfights. Two people were killed in a shooting in Southfield, Michigan, and a teenage male was killed in a shooting at a theater in Richmond, California. The violence lead to controversy for the movie.

In May 1998, eight people were shot and injured in a gang-related attack during a screening of I Got the Hook Up at a theater in Bakersfield, California.

On December 25, 2008, in Philadelphia, during a screening of The Curious Case of Benjamin Button, a 29-year-old man got upset at a loud man in a theater and threw popcorn at his son and shot the man in the left arm. The shooter was found guilty of aggravated assault and sentenced to 11 to 23 months of house arrest and 5 years of probation.

A screening of Alice in Wonderland had to be stopped short at the Regal Stadium 14 in Bowie, Maryland due to a fight that occurred over a teenager who constantly put her feet on the chair of a child sitting in front of her. The father of the child had to be escorted out of the theater by local police.

On January 13, 2014, a 71-year-old retired police officer shot at a couple who were allegedly texting during a screening of Lone Survivor in Wesley Chapel, Florida. The 43-year-old male victim died soon afterwards. The suspect was charged with second degree murder and attempted murder.

=== Mass shootings ===
On July 20, 2012, during a midnight screening of the film The Dark Knight Rises at a Century movie theater in Aurora, Colorado, James Eagan Holmes perpetrated a mass shooting, killing 12 and injuring 70 others. It was the second-deadliest shooting in Colorado, and had the largest number of casualties of any U.S. mass shooting until the Orlando nightclub shooting. Christian Bale, who plays Batman in the film, visited several victims in the hospital. The shooting also led to threats of violence across other theaters in the county screening The Dark Knight Rises, as well as an increase in security in theaters. Holmes is currently serving a sentence of life without parole.

On July 23, 2015, during a screening of Trainwreck, John Russel Houser opened fire at The Grand Theatre in Lafayette, Louisiana, killing two and wounding nine others, before committing suicide.
