= Stanley Theater (Utica, New York) =

Theater in Utica, New York, United States

Stanley Center for the Arts
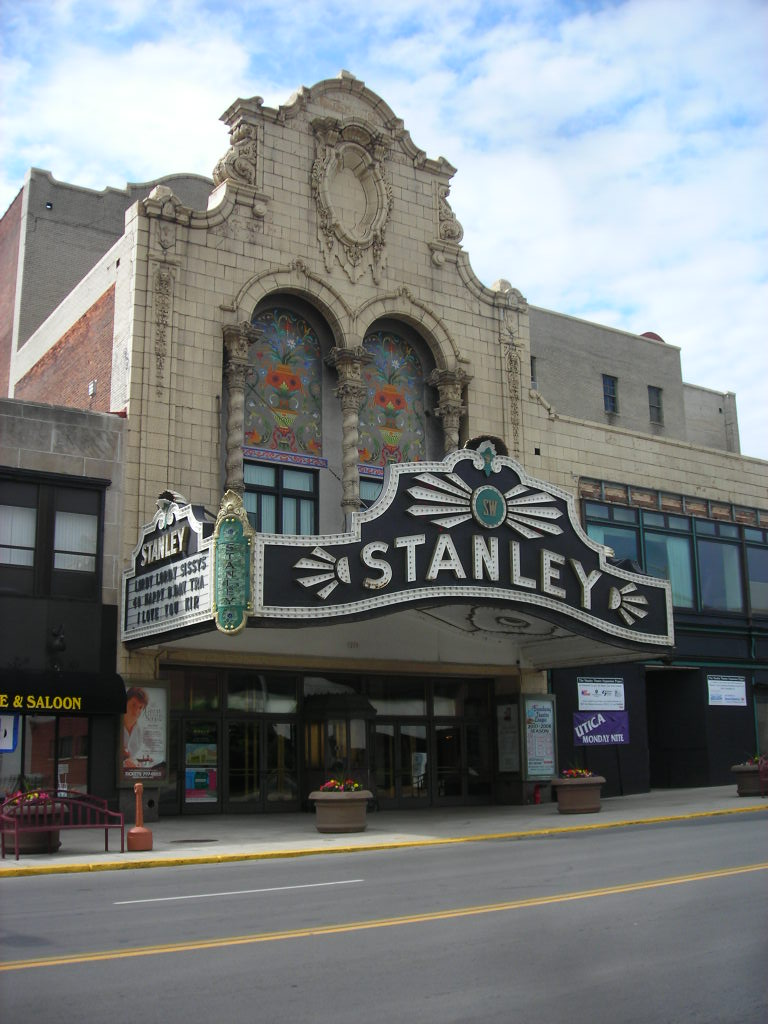
- Interactive map of Stanley Center for the Arts
- Address: 261 Genesee Street; Utica, New York; United States
- Owner: Stanley Center for the Arts
- Capacity: 2,963
- Type: Movie palace
- Screen: 1
- Current use: Performing arts center

Construction
- Opened: September 10, 1928

Website
- www.thestanley.org
- Stanley Theater
- U.S. National Register of Historic Places
- Location within New York Location within the United States
- Coordinates: 43°5′56″N 75°14′10″W
- Architect: Thomas W. Lamb
- Architectural style: Baroque
- NRHP reference No.: 76001255
- Added to NRHP: August 13, 1976

The Stanley Theatre is a historic Baroque movie palace in Utica, New York. Over the years, it has gone through several changes of ownership, but has always been affiliated with Warner Brothers Pictures.

== History ==
Originally owned by the Stanley-Mark Strand Corporation chain (founded by brothers Mitchel H. Mark and Moe Mark), the Stanley Theatre (and entire movie theatre chain) was purchased three days before opening by Warner Brothers. The company was eager to showcase its products on as many screens as possible. The theatre opened on September 10, 1928, with the silent movie Ramona starring Dolores del Río.

Thomas W. Lamb, a prolific theatre architect, designed the 2,963 seat cinema for the Mastbaum chain of theatres. The theatre was named for Stanley, one of the Mastbaum brothers. While Lamb and his firm designed over 300 theatres worldwide, he is considered to be somewhat of a local, having owned a camp in the Adirondacks. (His great-grandson lives in the Albany area today.)

The Stanley was built in less than 13 months on the expanding southern edge of downtown, some four blocks away from Utica's theatre district. All the theatres located there were razed during the Urban Renewal era of the 1960s and 70s. The Stanley remained open through all of this, though it suffered many years of neglect. In 1974, when the threat of destruction became very real, the Central New York Community Arts Council (renamed Stanley Center for the Arts in 2008) spearheaded a campaign to acquire the property, which it did for $135,000.

The design motif of the Stanley Theatre is dubbed "Mexican Baroque" because of its unique blend of styles. The terra cotta and tiled mosaic exterior shows the Mexican influence, while Habsburg lions, Indian faces, and a multitude of angels and cherubs grace the lavish gold leaf Baroque theatre interior. Moorish influence is also evident in the star-splashed ceiling and twisted columns flanking the stage. Legend has it that the grand entry staircase was designed to resemble the main staircase on the Titanic ocean liner.

While the Stanley Theatre continued to be primarily a movie house, it introduced live events early in its history. Today it is host to the Munson-Williams-Proctor Arts Institute Great Artists Series (over 75 years); Broadway Theatre League (50 years); Utica Symphony (over 60 years); and the Mohawk Valley Ballet (over 25 years).

Notable early performers included legendary singers Marian Anderson, Ezio Pinza, Lily Pons, Jeanette MacDonald, and Gene Autry. Later illustrious entertainers included Chuck Mangione, Conway Twitty, Dave Matthews, Third Eye Blind, Diana Ross, Barry Manilow, and Harry Connick Jr. The Stanley was also host to multiple appearances by Jerry Seinfeld, Wynton Marsalis, George Carlin, Itzhak Perlman, Bob Weir & RatDog!, and B.B. King. More recent performances include Aretha Franklin and legendary songwriter Burt Bacharach. The Broadway Theatre League brought in National Touring productions of Cats, Annie, Evita, Sweeney Todd, and Barnum.

The theater was added to the National Register of Historic Places in 1976. It is significant for its relationship to the early movie industry and its distinctive architecture.

The Stanley underwent major renovations in 2007.
