= Adolph Zukor =

Hungarian-American film producer (1873–1976)

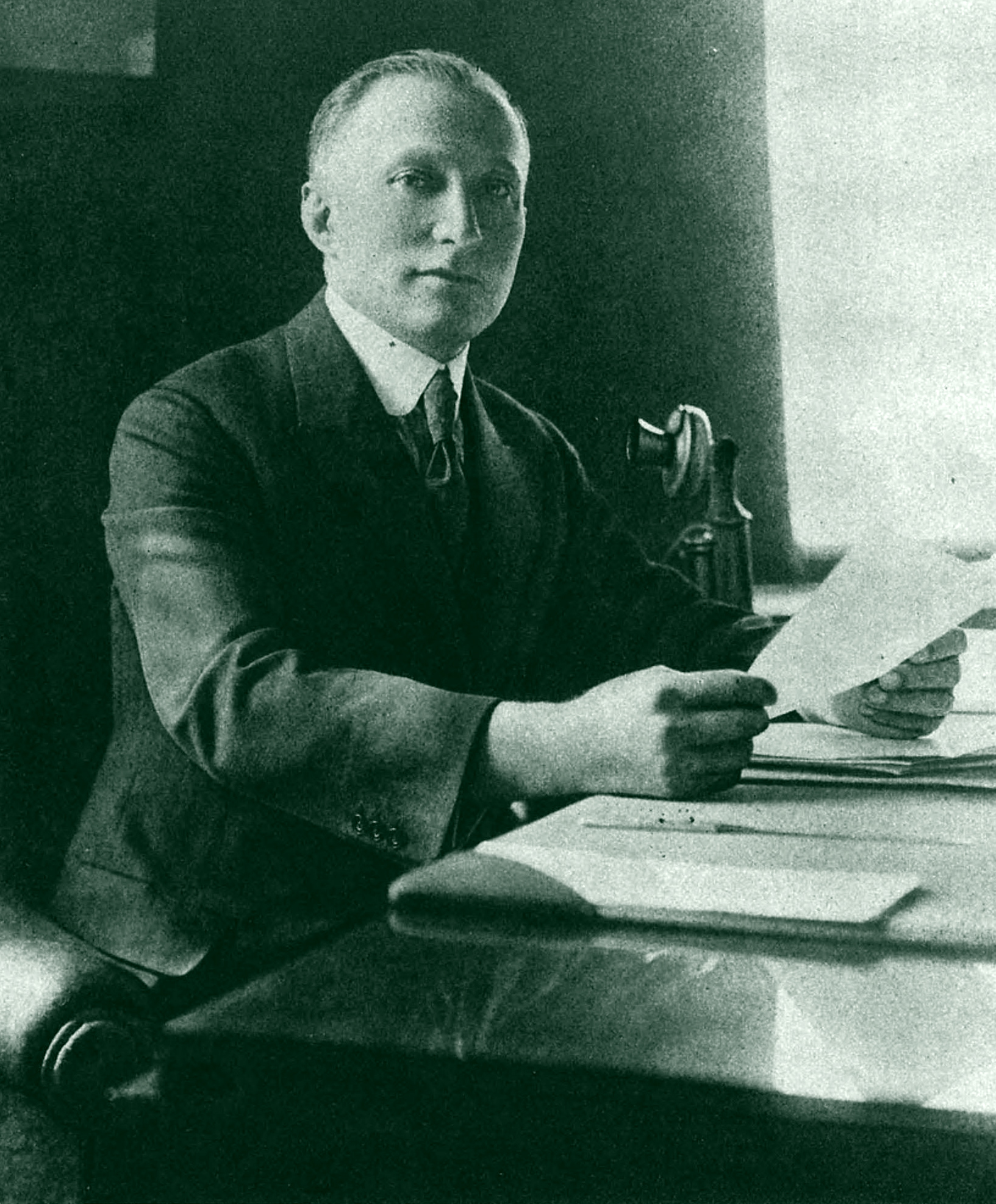
- Zukor in 1922
- Born: 7 January 1873; Ricse, Kingdom of Hungary, Austria-Hungary
- Died: 10 June 1976 (aged 103); Los Angeles, California, U.S.
- Resting place: Temple Israel Cemetery, Hastings-on-Hudson, New York
- Other name: Adolf Zuckery
- Occupation: Film producer
- Years active: 1903–1959
- Known for: One of the three founders of Paramount Pictures
- Spouse: Lottie Kaufman (m. 1897; died 1956)
- Children: 2
- Family: Marcus Loew

Signature
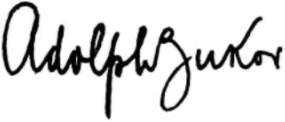

Adolph Zukor (/ˈzuːkər/; Hungarian: Czukor Adolf; 7 January 1873 – 10 June 1976) was a Hungarian-American film producer best known as one of the three founders of Paramount Pictures. He produced one of America's first feature-length films, The Prisoner of Zenda, in 1913.

== Early life ==
Zukor was born to an Ashkenazi Jewish family in Ricse, in the Kingdom of Hungary in January 1873, which was then a part of the Austro-Hungarian Empire. His father, Jacob, who operated a general store, died when he was a toddler, while his mother, Hannah Liebermann, died when he was 7 years old. Adolph and his brother Arthur moved in with Kalman Liebermann, their uncle. Liebermann, a rabbi, expected his nephews to become rabbis, but instead Adolph served a three-year apprenticeship in the dry goods store of family friends. When he was 16, he decided to emigrate to the United States. He sailed from Hamburg on the S.S. Rugia on 1 March and arrived in New York City under the name Adolf Zuckery on 16 March 1891. Like most immigrants, he began modestly. After landing in New York City, he began working in an upholstery shop. A friend then got him a job as an apprentice at a furrier.

Zukor stayed in New York City for two years. When he left to become a "contract" worker, sewing fur pieces and selling them himself, he was 20 years old and an accomplished designer. He was young and adventuresome, and the 1893 Columbian Exposition in Chicago drew him to the Midwest. There he started a fur business. In the second season of operation, Zukor's Novelty Fur Company expanded to 25 men and opened a branch.

Historian Neal Gabler wrote, "one of the stubborn fallacies of movie history is that the men who created the film industry were all impoverished young vulgarians..." Zukor clearly didn't fit this profile. By 1903, he already looked and lived like a wealthy young burgher, and he certainly earned the income of one. He had a commodious apartment at 111th Street and Seventh Avenue in New York City's wealthy German-Jewish section".

In 1918, he moved to New City, New York, where he purchased 300 acres of land from Lawrence Abraham, heir to the A&S Department Stores. Abraham had already built a sizable house, a nine-hole golf course and a swimming pool on this property. Two years later, Zukor bought an additional 500 acres, built a night house, guest house, movie theater, locker room, greenhouses, garages and staff quarters, and hired golf architect A.W. Tillinghast to build an 18-hole championship golf course. Today, Zukor's estate is the private Paramount Country Club.

== Early film career ==
In 1903, he became involved in the film industry when his cousin, Max Goldstein, approached him for a loan to invest in a chain of theaters. These theaters were started by Mitchell Mark in Buffalo, New York, and hosted Edisonia Hall. Mark needed investors to expand his chain of theaters. Zukor gave Goldstein the loan and formed a partnership with Mark and Morris Kohn, a friend of Zukor's who also invested in the theaters. Zukor, Mark, and Kohn opened a penny arcade operating as the Automatic Vaudeville Company on 14th Street in New York City. They soon opened branches in Boston, Philadelphia, and Newark, with funding by Marcus Loew. By 1910, Zukor already owned a nickelodeon chain and became Loew's partner in a theater circuit. Two years later, he sold his shares in Loew's company in order to purchase the French film, Queen Elizabeth.

== Famous Players ==
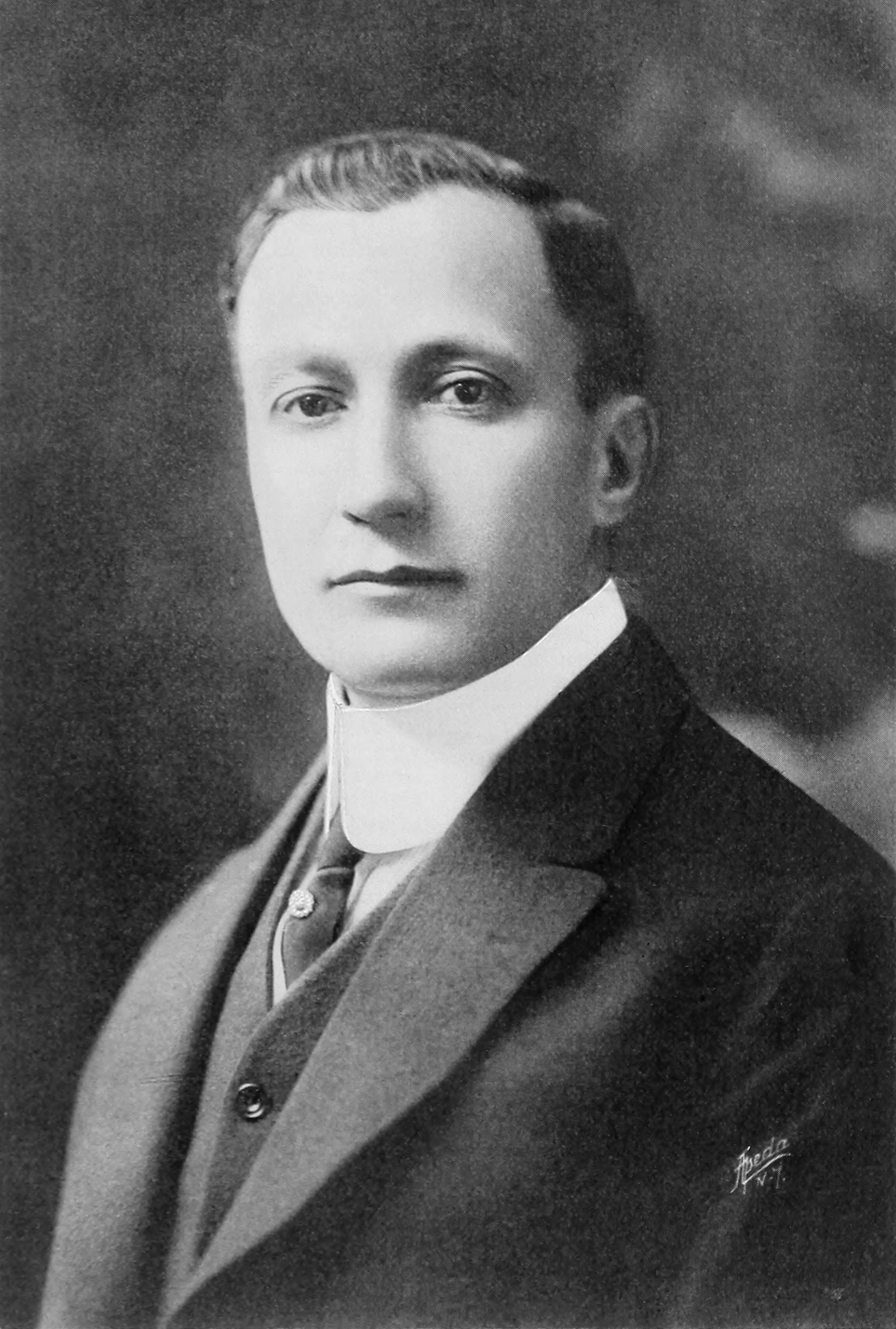
Zukor in 1913

In 1912, Adolph Zukor established Famous Players Film Company—advertising "Famous Players in Famous Plays"—as the American distribution company for the French film production Les Amours de la reine Élisabeth starring Sarah Bernhardt. The following year he obtained the financial backing of the Frohman brothers, the powerful New York City theatre impresarios. Their primary goal was to bring noted stage actors to the screen and Zukor went on to produce The Prisoner of Zenda (1913). He purchased an armory on 26th Street in Manhattan and converted it into Chelsea Studios, a movie studio that is still used today.

In 1916, the company merged with Jesse L. Lasky's company to form Famous Players–Lasky.

== Paramount Pictures ==
The Paramount Pictures Corporation was formed to distribute films made by Famous Players–Lasky and a dozen smaller companies which were pulled into Zukor's corporate giant. The consolidations led to the formation of a nationwide film distribution system.

In 1917, Zukor acquired 50% of Lewis J. Selznick's Select Pictures which led Selznick's publicity to wane. Later, however, Selznick bought out Zukor's share of Select Pictures.

Zukor shed most of his early partners; the Frohman brothers, Hodkinson and Goldwyn were out by 1917.

In 1919, the company bought 135 theatres in the Southern states, making the producing concern the first that guaranteed exhibition of its own product in its own theaters. He revolutionised the film industry by organising production, distribution, and exhibition within a single company.

Zukor believed in employing stars. He signed many of the early ones, including Mary Pickford, Roscoe "Fatty" Arbuckle, Marguerite Clark, Pauline Frederick, Douglas Fairbanks, Gloria Swanson, Rudolph Valentino, and Wallace Reid. With so many important players, Zukor also pioneered "Block Booking" for Paramount Pictures, which meant that an exhibitor who wanted a particular star's films had to buy a year's worth of other Paramount productions. That system gave Paramount a leading position in the 1920s and 1930s, but led the government to pursue it on antitrust grounds for more than 20 years.

Zukor was the driving force behind Paramount's success. Through the teens and twenties, he also built the Publix Theatres Corporation, a chain of nearly 2000 screens. He also ran two production studios, one in Astoria, New York (now the Kaufman Astoria Studios) and the other in Hollywood, California.

In 1923, Paramount under Zukor's leadership would begin distributing some sound film content through Phonofilm, with Phonofilm even initially being described during its 15 April 1923 public premiere as "Adolph Zukor presents Phonofilm."

In 1926, Zukor hired independent producer B. P. Schulberg, who had an unerring eye for new talent, to run the new West Coast operations. Lasky and Zukor purchased the Robert Brunton Studios, a 26-acre facility at 5451 Marathon Street, for US$1 million. In 1927, Famous Players–Lasky took the name Paramount Famous Lasky Corporation. In 1930, because of the importance of the Publix Theatres, it became the Paramount Publix Corporation.

By then, Zukor was turning out 60 features a year. He made deals to show them all in theaters controlled by Loew's Incorporated, and also continued to add more theaters to his own chain. By 1920, he was in a position to charge what he wished for film rentals. Thus he pioneered the concept, now the accepted practice in the film industry, by which the distributor charges the exhibitor a percentage of box-office receipts.

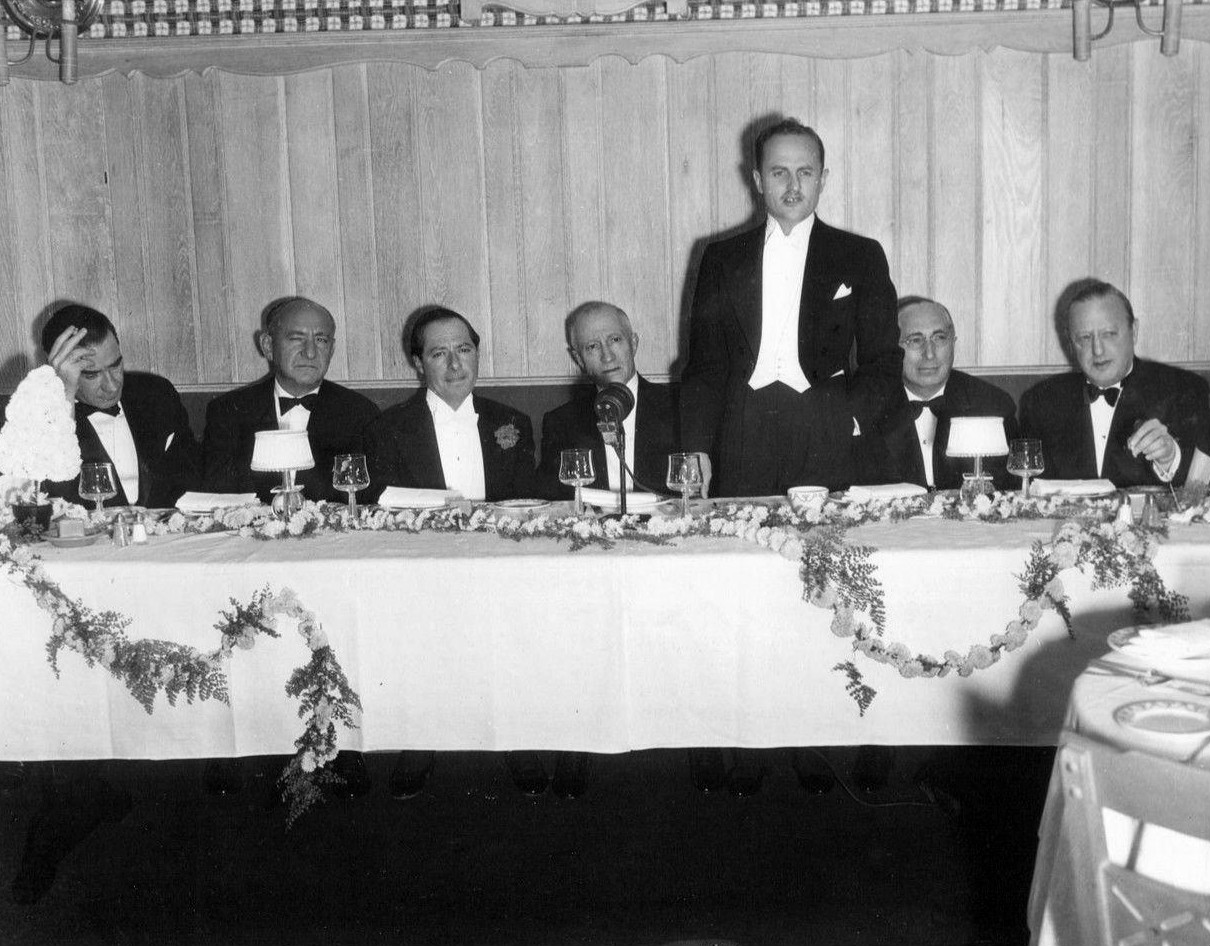
Zukor is honored with a dinner marking his 25 years in the film industry in 1936. From left: Frank Lloyd, Joseph M. Schenck, George Jessel, Zukor, Darryl F. Zanuck, Louis B. Mayer, and Jesse L. Lasky.

Zukor, ever the impresario, bought a huge plot of ground at Broadway and 43d Street, over objections of his board of directors, to build the Paramount Theater and office building, a 39-story building that had its grand opening in 1926. He managed to keep stars such as Pola Negri, Gloria Swanson, and most important of all, Mary Pickford, under contract and happy to stay at Paramount. At one point, Pickford told Zukor: "You know, for years I've dreamed of making $20,000 a year before I was 20, and I'll be 20 very soon."

"I could take a hint," Zukor recalled wryly. "She got the $20,000, and before long I was paying her $100,000 a year. Mary was a terrific businessman."

Zukor was, primarily, a businessman. "He did not take the same personal, down-to-the-last-detail interest in the making of his movies that producer-executives such as Samuel Goldwyn and Louis B. Mayer did," wrote The New York Times in Zukor's obituary at the age of 103. He became an early investor in radio, taking a 50 percent interest in the new Columbia Broadcasting System in 1928, but selling it within a few years.

Partner Lasky hung on until 1932, when Paramount nearly collapsed in the Great Depression years. Lasky was blamed for that and tossed out. In the following year, Paramount went into receivership. Ultimately at fault were Zukor's over-expansion and use of overvalued Paramount stock for purchases that made the company file for bankruptcy. A bank-mandated reorganisation team kept the company intact, and, miraculously, Zukor was able to return as production chief. On 4 June 1935, John E. Otterson became president. When Barney Balaban was appointed president on 2 July 1936, Zukor was relegated to chairman of the board.

He eventually spent most of his time in New York City, but passed the winter months in Hollywood to check on his studio. He retired from Paramount Pictures in 1959 and in 1964, stepped down as chairman and assumed Chairman Emeritus status, a position he held up until his death at the age of 103 in Los Angeles.

== Personal life and death ==
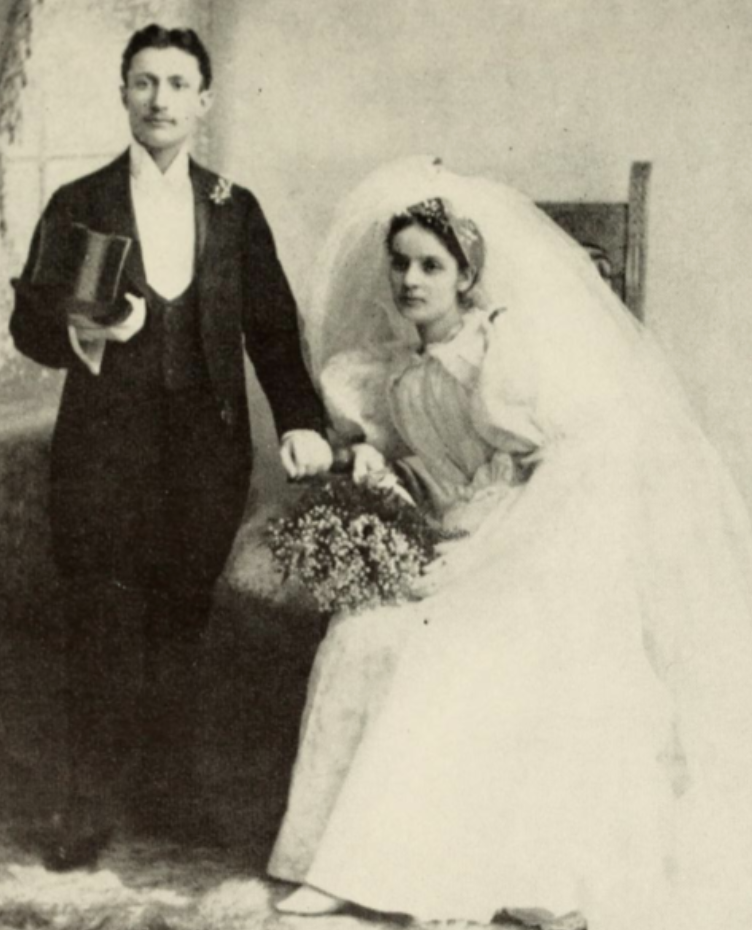
The wedding of Zukor and Kaufman, 1897

In 1897, he married Lottie Kaufman; they had two children, Eugene J. Zukor, who became a Paramount executive in 1916, and Mildred Zukor Loew who married Arthur Loew, son of Marcus Loew.

Zukor was a Freemason at Centennial Lodge No. 673, New York.

Zukor died from natural causes at his Los Angeles residence at age 103 on 10 June 1976. He is buried at the Temple Israel Cemetery in Hastings-on-Hudson, New York.

== Filmography ==
=== Producer ===
Year	Title	Director(s)
1912	Les Amours de la reine Élisabeth	Louis Mercanton Henri Desfontaines
1913	The Prisoner of Zenda	Hugh Ford
1924	Peter Pan	Herbert Brenon
1926	Beau Geste	Herbert Brenon
1927	Wings	William A. Wellman
1928	The Docks of New York	Josef von Sternberg
1928	The Wedding March	Erich von Stroheim
1931	Dr. Jekyll and Mr. Hyde	Rouben Mamoulian
1932	Shanghai Express	Josef von Sternberg
1936	The Milky Way	Leo McCarey
1937	Souls at Sea	Henry Hathaway
1938	Professor Beware	Elliott Nugent

=== Actor ===
Year	Title	Role	Notes
1929	Glorifying the American Girl	Himself	Uncredited
