= Wrap (filmmaking) =

Completion of filming

Wrap, as used in the phrase "That's a wrap", has been used by directors since the early days of the film industry to signal the end of filming. Since the 1920s, filmmakers have been using this phrase when principal photography is concluded and the film is ready to go into post-production. At that point, it is traditional to hold a wrap party for the cast and crew of the film. This marks the end of the actors' collaboration with each other, the director, producer, and crew on the film (except for possible dubbing or pick-ups). However, the leading cast members may be called in several months or years later to help promote the film when it is ready to be released.

The long-commonplace phrase "Let's wrap it up" or "Time to wrap things up" is the most likely origin. The term "wrap" is sometimes said to be an acronym for "wind, reel, and print”. Printing would typically be done at the end of each shoot day (or when else desired, usually as soon as possible for safety of the picture) and not at the end of an entire shoot. This is illustrated by use of the phrase "cut and print", which was used to signify a request the film just shot should be "printed" (the negative developed and transferred to a positive print) for viewing. Film is neither wound nor reeled at the end of a shoot but rather unloaded and "canned", which is where "It's in the can" originates.

"That's a wrap!" can also be heard in similar contexts such as photo shoots.

Some directors also announce "wraps" for each actor when their work concludes (e.g., "That's a wrap for John Doe").
