= American Film Institute =

Nonprofit educational arts organization

- Abbreviation: AFI
- Founded: June 5, 1967; 59 years ago
- Type: Nonprofit
- Purpose: To educate filmmakers and honor the heritage of the history of cinema in the United States
- Location: Los Angeles, California, U.S.
- Key people: Bob Gazzale (president and CEO); Kathleen Kennedy (chair, Board of Trustees); Robert A. Daly (chair, board of directors)
- Website: afi.com

The American Film Institute (AFI) is an American nonprofit film organization that educates filmmakers and honors the heritage of the motion picture arts in the United States. AFI is supported by private funding and public membership fees.

== Leadership ==
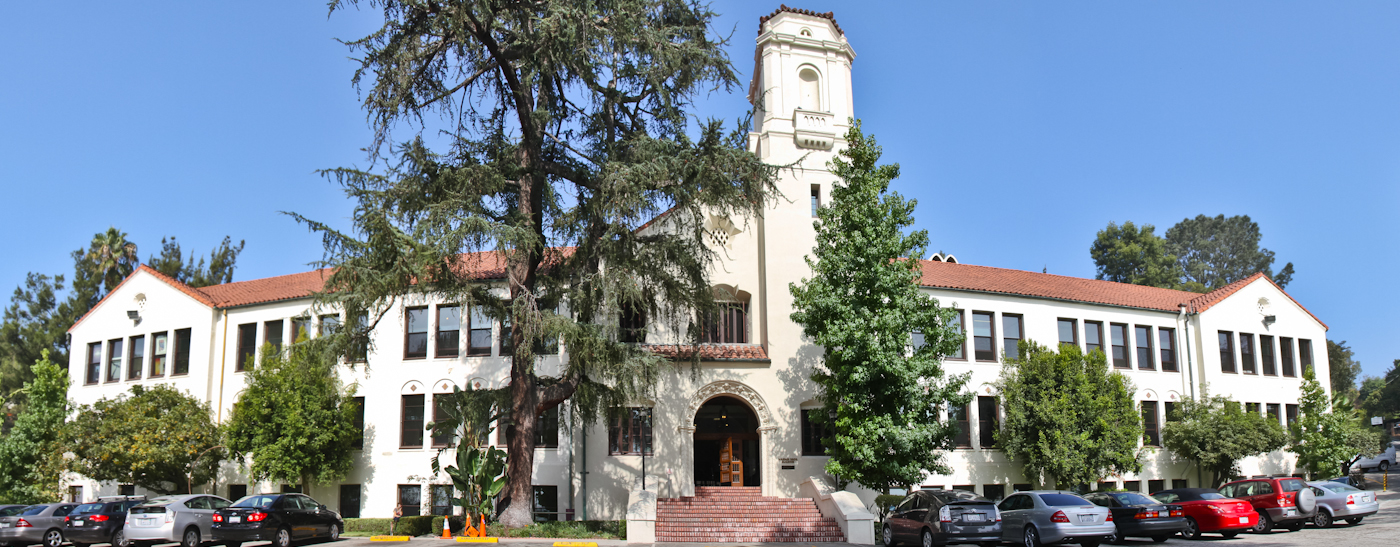
The historic Spanish Colonial Revival style AFI campus in Los Angeles, in the Los Feliz district of L.A.

The institute is composed of leaders from the film, entertainment, business, and academic communities. The board of trustees is chaired by Kathleen Kennedy and the board of directors chaired by Robert A. Daly guide the organization, which is led by President and CEO, film historian Bob Gazzale. Prior leaders were founding director George Stevens Jr. (from the organization's inception in 1967 until 1980) and Jean Picker Firstenberg (from 1980 to 2007).

== History ==
The American Film Institute was founded by a 1965 presidential mandate announced in the Rose Garden of the White House by Lyndon B. Johnson—to establish a national arts organization to preserve the legacy of American film heritage, educate the next generation of filmmakers, and honor the artists and their work. Two years later, in 1967, AFI was established, supported by the National Endowment for the Arts, the Motion Picture Association of America and the Ford Foundation.

The original 22-member Board of Trustees included actor Gregory Peck as chairman and actor Sidney Poitier as vice-chairman, as well as director Francis Ford Coppola, film historian Arthur Schlesinger, Jr., lobbyist Jack Valenti, and other representatives from the arts and academia.

The institute established a training program for filmmakers known then as the Center for Advanced Film Studies. Also created in the early years were a repertory film exhibition program at the Kennedy Center for the Performing Arts and the AFI Catalog of Feature Films — a scholarly source for American film history. The institute moved to its current eight-acre Hollywood campus in 1981. The film training program grew into the AFI Conservatory, an accredited graduate school.

AFI moved its presentation of first-run and auteur films from the Kennedy Center to the historic AFI Silver Theatre and Cultural Center, which hosts the AFI DOCS film festival, making AFI the largest nonprofit film exhibitor in the world. AFI educates audiences and recognizes artistic excellence through its awards programs and 10 Top 10 Lists.

In 2017, then-aspiring filmmaker Ilana Bar-Din Giannini claimed that the AFI expelled her after she accused Dezso Magyar of sexually harassing her in the early 1980s.

== List of programs in brief ==
AFI educational and cultural programs include:

- American Film Institute Awards – an honor celebrating the creative ensembles of the most outstanding motion picture and television programs of the year
- AFI Catalog of Feature Films and AFI Archive – the written history of all feature films during the first 100 years of the art form – accessible free online
- AFI Conservatory – a film school led by master filmmakers in a graduate-level program
- AFI Directing Workshop for Women – a production-based training program committed to increasing the number of women working professionally in screen directing
- AFI Life Achievement Award – a tradition since 1973, a high honor for a career in film
- AFI 100 Years... series – television events and movie reference lists
- AFI's two film festivals – AFI Fest in Los Angeles and AFI Docs in Washington, D.C., and Silver Spring, Maryland
- AFI Silver Theatre and Cultural Center – a historic theater with year-round art house, first-run and classic film programming in Silver Spring, Maryland
- American Film – a magazine launched in October 1975 that explores the art of new and historic film classics, now a blog on AFI.com

== AFI Conservatory ==
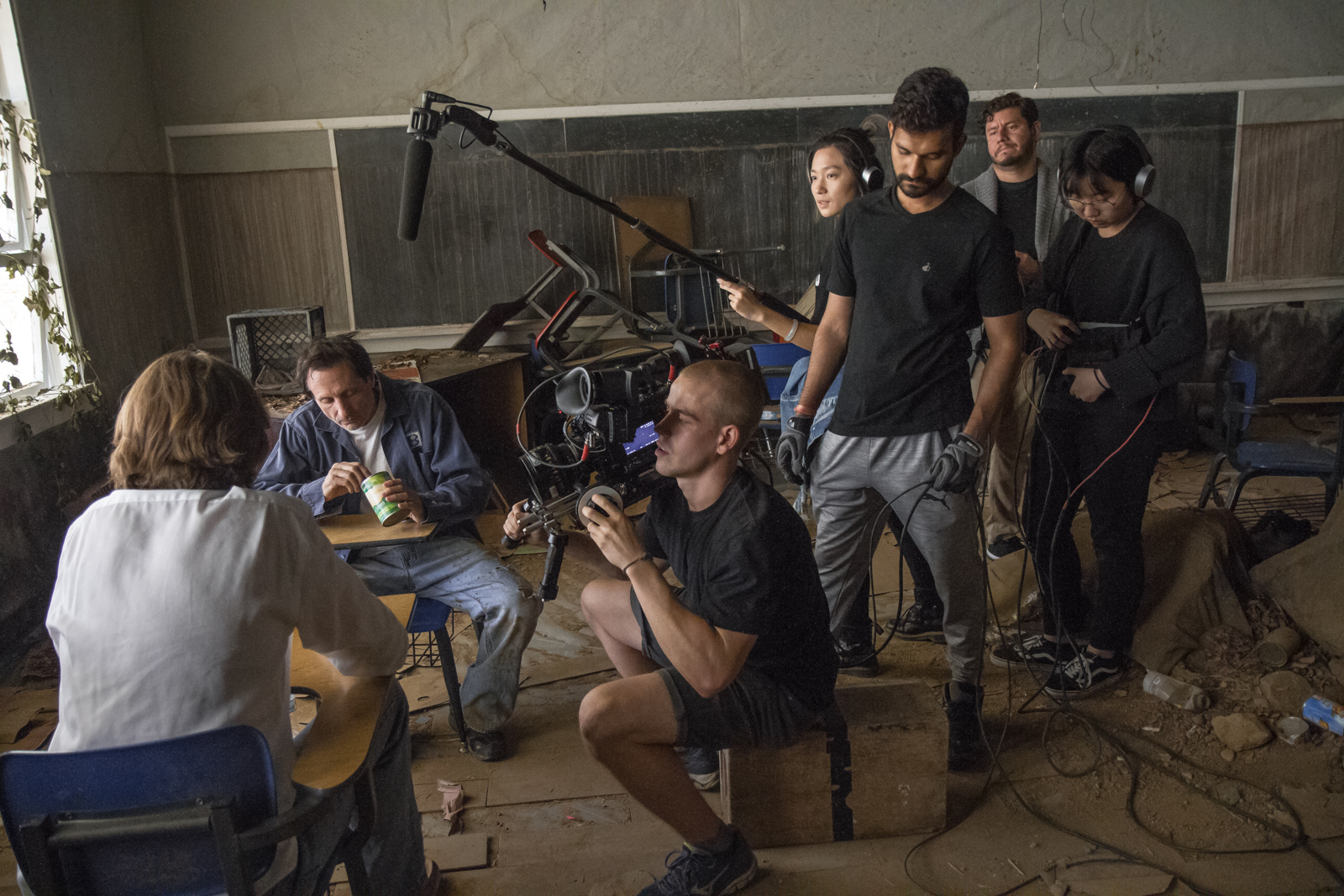
AFI Conservatory Fellows filming on the AFI campus

In 1969, the institute established the AFI Conservatory for Advanced Film Studies at Greystone, the Doheny Mansion in Beverly Hills, California. The first class included filmmakers Terrence Malick, Caleb Deschanel, and Paul Schrader. That program grew into the AFI Conservatory, an accredited graduate film school located in the hills above Hollywood, California, providing training in six filmmaking disciplines: cinematography, directing, editing, producing, production design, and screenwriting. Mirroring a professional production environment, Fellows collaborate to make more films than any other graduate level program. Admission to AFI Conservatory is highly selective, with a maximum of 140 graduates per year.

In 2013, Emmy and Oscar-winning director, producer, and screenwriter James L. Brooks (As Good as It Gets, Broadcast News, Terms of Endearment) joined as the artistic director of the AFI Conservatory where he provides leadership for the film program. Brooks' artistic role at the AFI Conservatory has a rich legacy that includes Daniel Petrie, Jr., Robert Wise, and Frank Pierson. Award-winning director Bob Mandel served as dean of the AFI Conservatory for nine years. Jan Schuette took over as dean in 2014 and served until 2017. Film producer Richard Gladstein was dean from 2017 until 2019, when Susan Ruskin was appointed.

=== Notable alumni ===
AFI Conservatory's alumni have careers in film, television and on the web. They have been recognized with all of the major industry awards—Academy Award, Emmy Award, guild awards, and the Tony Award.

== AFI Film Festivals ==
AFI operates two film festivals: AFI Fest in Los Angeles, and AFI Docs (formally known as Silverdocs) in Silver Spring, Maryland, and Washington, D.C.

=== American Film Institute Festival ===
Commonly shortened to AFI Fest, it is the American Film Institute's annual celebration of artistic excellence. It is a showcase for the best festival films of the year as selected by AFI and an opportunity for master filmmakers and emerging artists to come together with audiences. It is the only festival of its stature that is free to the public. The Academy of Motion Picture Arts and Sciences recognizes AFI Fest as a qualifying festival for the Short Films category for the annual Academy Awards.

The festival was first announced in January 1987 to take the place of Filmex in March 1987 with Ken Wlaschin, former Filmex artistic director, named as director of the new festival. The first festival was funded with a grant of $200,000 from the Interface Group and was to feature 80 films in a non-competitive format with a mix of independent American and foreign films. Its primary venue was the Los Feliz Theater.

The festival has paid tribute to numerous influential filmmakers and artists over the years, including Agnès Varda, Pedro Almodóvar and David Lynch as guest artistic directors, and has screened scores of films that have gone on to win Oscar nominations and awards.

The movies selected by AFI are assigned to different sections for the festival; these include Galas/Red Carpet Premieres, Special Screenings, Documentaries, Discovery, and Short Film Competition.

==== Red Carpet Premieres ====
Formerly named Galas, it is AFI Fest's section for the most highly anticipated films at the festival, presenting selected feature-length movies from world-class filmmakers and artisans. Although it is a very restrictive selection, usually presenting between three and seven movies at most, many films selected by AFI for this section eventually also earn an Academy Award Best Picture nomination. Examples include Bradley Cooper's Maestro (2023), Steven Spielberg's The Fabelmans (2022), Will Smith's King Richard (2021), Jane Campion's The Power of the Dog (2021), Anthony Hopkins's The Father (2020), Noah Baumbach's Marriage Story (2019), Peter Farrelly's Green Book (2018), Luca Guadagnino's Call Me by Your Name (2017), Damien Chazelle's La La Land (2016), and Adam McKay's The Big Short (2015).

=== AFI Docs ===
Held annually in June, AFI Docs (formerly Silverdocs) is a documentary festival in Washington, D.C. The festival attracts over 27,000 documentary enthusiasts.

== AFI programs ==
=== AFI Catalog of Feature Films ===
The AFI Catalog, started in 1968, is a web-based filmographic database. A research tool for film historians, the catalog consists of entries on more than 60,000 feature films and 17,000 short films produced from 1893 to 2011, as well as AFI Awards Outstanding Movies of the Year from 2000 through 2010. Early print copies of this catalog may also be found at local libraries.

=== AFI Awards ===
Created in 2000, the AFI Awards honor the ten outstanding films ("Movies of the Year") and ten outstanding television programs ("TV Programs of the Year"). The awards are a non-competitive acknowledgment of excellence.

The awards are announced in December, and a private luncheon for award honorees takes place the following January.

=== AFI 100 Years... series ===
The AFI 100 Years... series, which ran from 1998 to 2008 and created jury-selected lists of America's best movies in categories such as Musicals, Laughs and Thrills, prompted new generations to experience classic American films. The juries consisted of over 1,500 artists, scholars, critics, and historians. Citizen Kane was voted the greatest American film twice.

=== AFI Silver Theatre and Cultural Center ===
The AFI Silver Theatre and Cultural Center is a moving image exhibition, education, and cultural center in Silver Spring, Maryland. Its 32,000-square-foot facility, centered on architect John Eberson's historic 1938 Silver Theatre, has two stadium theatres, office and meeting space, and reception and exhibit areas.

The AFI Silver Theatre and Cultural Center presents film and video programming, augmented by filmmaker interviews, panels, discussions, and musical performances.

=== The AFI Directing Workshop for Women ===
The Directing Workshop for Women is a training program committed to educating and mentoring participants in an effort to increase the number of women working professionally in screen directing. In this tuition-free program, each participant is required to complete a short film by the end of the year-long program.

Alumnae of the program include Maya Angelou, Anne Bancroft, Dyan Cannon, Ellen Burstyn, Jennifer Getzinger, Lesli Linka Glatter, Lily Tomlin, Susan Oliver and Nancy Malone.

== AFI Directors Series ==
AFI released a set of hour-long programs reviewing the career of acclaimed directors. The Directors Series content was copyrighted in 1997 by Media Entertainment Inc and The American Film Institute, and the VHS and DVDs were released between 1999 and 2001 on Winstar TV and Video.

Directors featured included:

- John McTiernan (WHE73067)
- Ron Howard (WHE73068)
- Sydney Pollack (WHE73071)
- Norman Jewison (WHE73076)
- Lawrence Kasdan (WHE73088)
- Terry Gilliam (WHE73089)
- Spike Lee (WHE73090)
- Barry Levinson (WHE73093)
- Miloš Forman (WHE73094)
- Martin Scorsese (WHE73098)
- Barbra Streisand (WHE73099)
- David Cronenberg (WHE73101)
- Robert Zemeckis (WHE73131)
- Robert Altman
- John Frankenheimer
- Adrian Lyne
- Garry Marshall
- William Friedkin
- Clint Eastwood
- David Zucker, Jim Abrahams and Jerry Zucker
- Roger Corman
- Michael Mann
- James Cameron
- Rob Reiner
- Joel Schumacher
- Steven Spielberg
- Wes Craven

== See also ==
- British Film Institute – the British equivalent to AFI
