= Mitchel H. Mark =

American pioneer of motion pictures and movie theaters (1868–1918)

- Born: Mitchel Henry Mark; 1868; Richmond, Virginia
- Died: March 20, 1918 (aged 49–50); Buffalo, New York
- Resting place: Forest Lawn Cemetery
- Spouse: Estelle Brock
- Children: 2
- Relatives: Moe Mark (brother); Victor Lownes III (grandson)

Mitchel Henry Mark (1868 – March 20, 1918) was a pioneer of motion picture exhibition and movie theaters in the United States.

== Early life ==
Mitchel Henry Mark was born in 1868 in Richmond, Virginia. Early in his life, he moved to Buffalo, New York, and began in the wholesale hat trade, keeping a store in Buffalo the rest of his life.

== Career ==
=== Early career ===
Along with his younger brother, Moe Mark (1872–1932), Mitchel founded the Vitascope Theater (a special attraction of his Edisonia Hall in the Ellicott Square Building), one of the first permanent, purpose-built movie theaters in the world. It opened Monday, October 19, 1896 (according to local papers), in Buffalo, New York. It operated nearly two years, the longest run for any such theater at that time: comparable early theaters were temporary and lasted only days or weeks. Mark was the first American to have a distribution arrangement with Pathé Frères to import Pathé films to the United States. Indeed, nearly the entire Vitascope Theatre program of October 19, 1896, consisted of Lumiere films.

=== Expansion ===
Again with his brother, Mitchel founded the Automatic Vaudeville Company in 1904 in New York City. Among their partners were Adolph Zukor (co-founder with Jesse Lasky of Paramount Pictures) and Marcus Loew (founder of Loew's Theatres). It was based in form on Edisonia Hall and the Vitascope Theatre in Buffalo. The Mark brothers eventually built and operated dozens of theaters in the United States.

- In 1907, Mark was credited with installing the first church organ to be used for the movies, at Cleveland's Alhambra Theatre.
- In 1914, Mark Brothers opened the Strand Theatre at 47th Street and Broadway in Times Square, New York City. Costing one million dollars, this theater may have been the first real movie palace, specifically built only to show motion pictures. It was designed by Thomas W. Lamb and served as a model for many film theaters that soon followed it. The New York Times favorably reviewed the opening of this theater, helping to establish its importance. To manage the theater, Mark personally hired Samuel "Roxy" Rothafel, who went on to become the best known motion picture showman in New York City.

The Mark Brothers owned and operated more than a dozen theaters in the United States and Canada called "Mark-Strand" or "Mark Strand". By 1917, Mark's importance in motion picture exhibition was such that when Cecil B. DeMille complained in his autobiography that exhibitors were protesting the high price of Hollywood movie rentals, he cited Mitchel Mark along with Thomas Lincoln Tally as the worst offenders.

- On December 31, 1917, Mark received a determination from the New York State Supreme Court that he had the sole right to use the name "The Strand" for a movie theater.

== Personal life ==
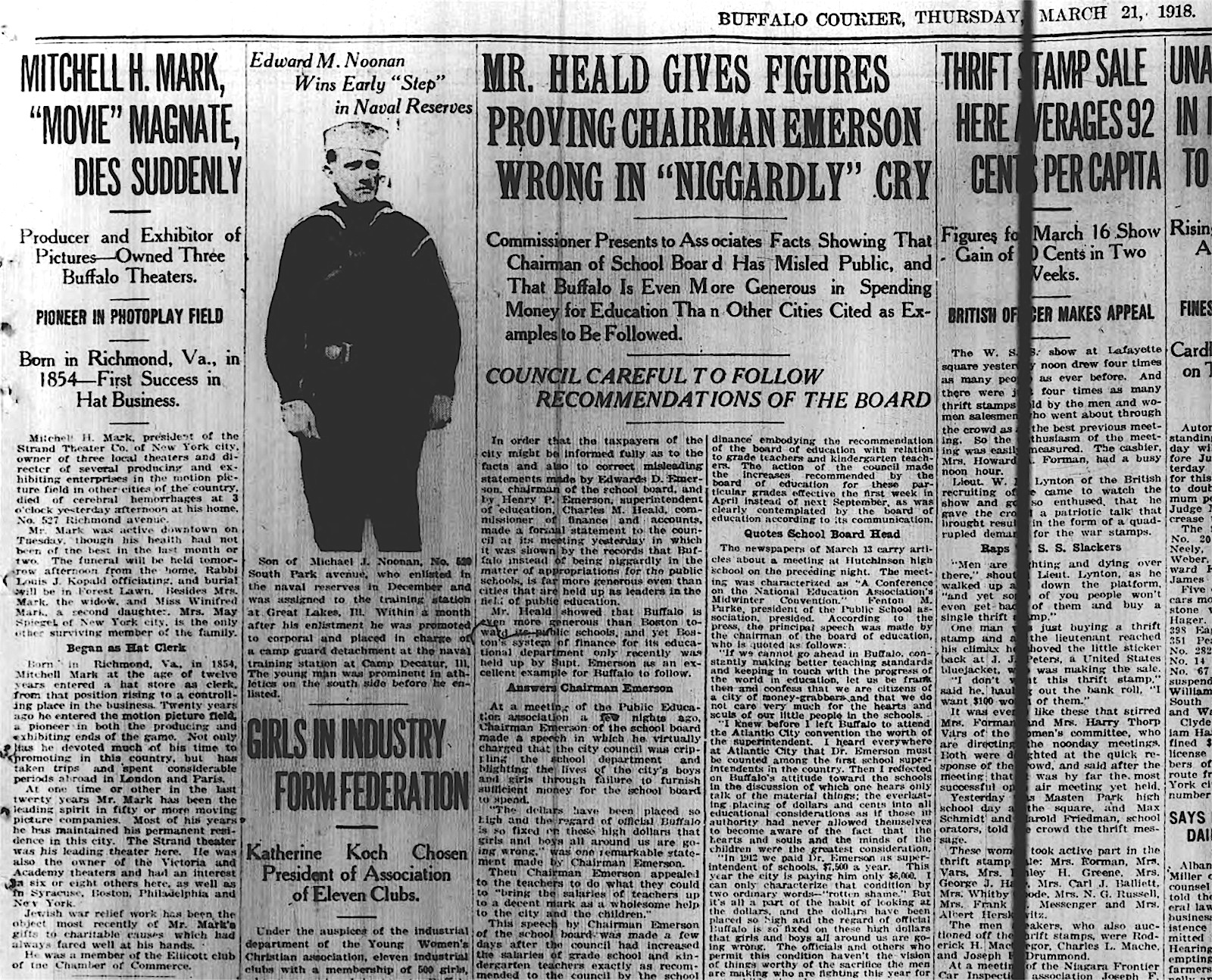
Mark's obituary in the Buffalo Courier

Mark was married to Estelle "Stella" Brock with whom he had two daughters:

- Annette Mark, who married Max Spiegel, a Secretary of the Mitchel H. Mark Realty Corporation, and lived in New York City
- Winifred "Winnie" Mark (1905–1990), who married Victor Aubrey Lownes Jr. (1905–1952) on June 1, 1927, and lived in Buffalo. They were the parents of Playboy executive Victor Lownes III (1928–2017).

Mark was prominent in Jewish charitable and religious circles in Buffalo and was a member of Temple Beth Zion. On March 20, 1918, Mark died of an infection at his family's home at 527 Richmond Avenue at the corner of Breckenridge in Buffalo. His body was buried in Forest Lawn Cemetery, Buffalo. At the time of Mark's death, his brother, Moe Mark, was living in Lynn, Massachusetts, and his sister, who was married to William A. Rosentahl, lived in Buffalo.

Although his name is often spelled "Mitchell", the name on his mausoleum at Forest Lawn Cemetery is spelled "Mitchel H. Mark".
