= Columbia Theatre (Washington, D.C.) =

Theater in Washington, D.C., U.S.

Coordinates: 38°53′49.8″N 77°1′38.2″W

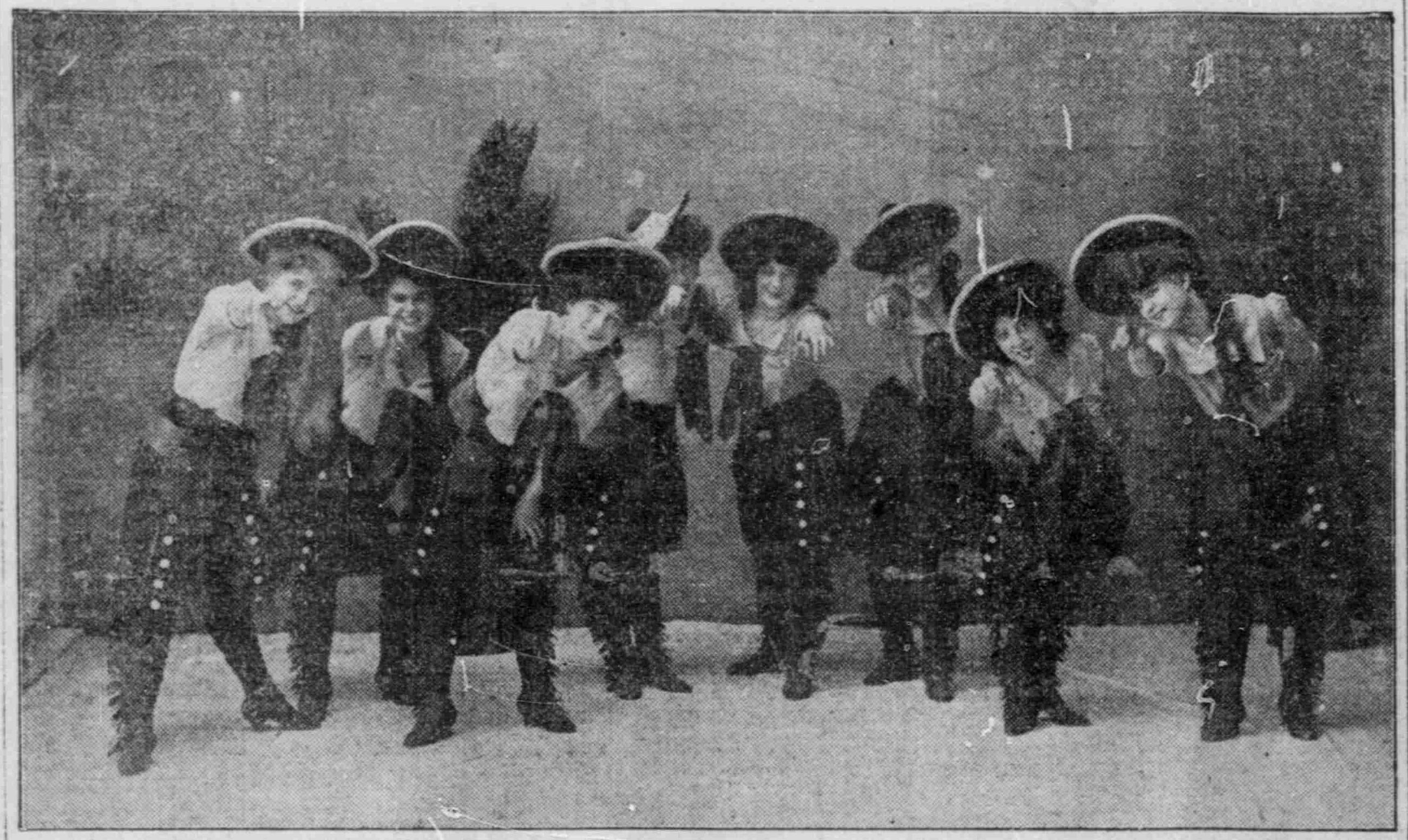
The "Dashing Dolly Girls" in Richard Carle's The Tenderfoot at the Columbia Theater, December 1903

The Columbia Theatre, located at 1112 F Street NW, Washington, DC, United States, was a theater built and opened in 1891, closed and demolished in 1959. The Arnold & Porter Building is on the site today.

== Loew's Columbia Theatre ==
The theater was taken over by Marcus Loew in 1915 in his first Loew's Theaters venture outside New York, to present vaudeville and movies. Among them Going Native was a 1940 and 1941 annual revue show Arthur Godfrey was staged and produced by Eugene Forde.
