= Usher (occupation) =

Person who assists visitors by showing the way in a building or to correct seats

An usher is a person who welcomes and shows people where to sit, especially at a church, theatre or when attending a wedding.

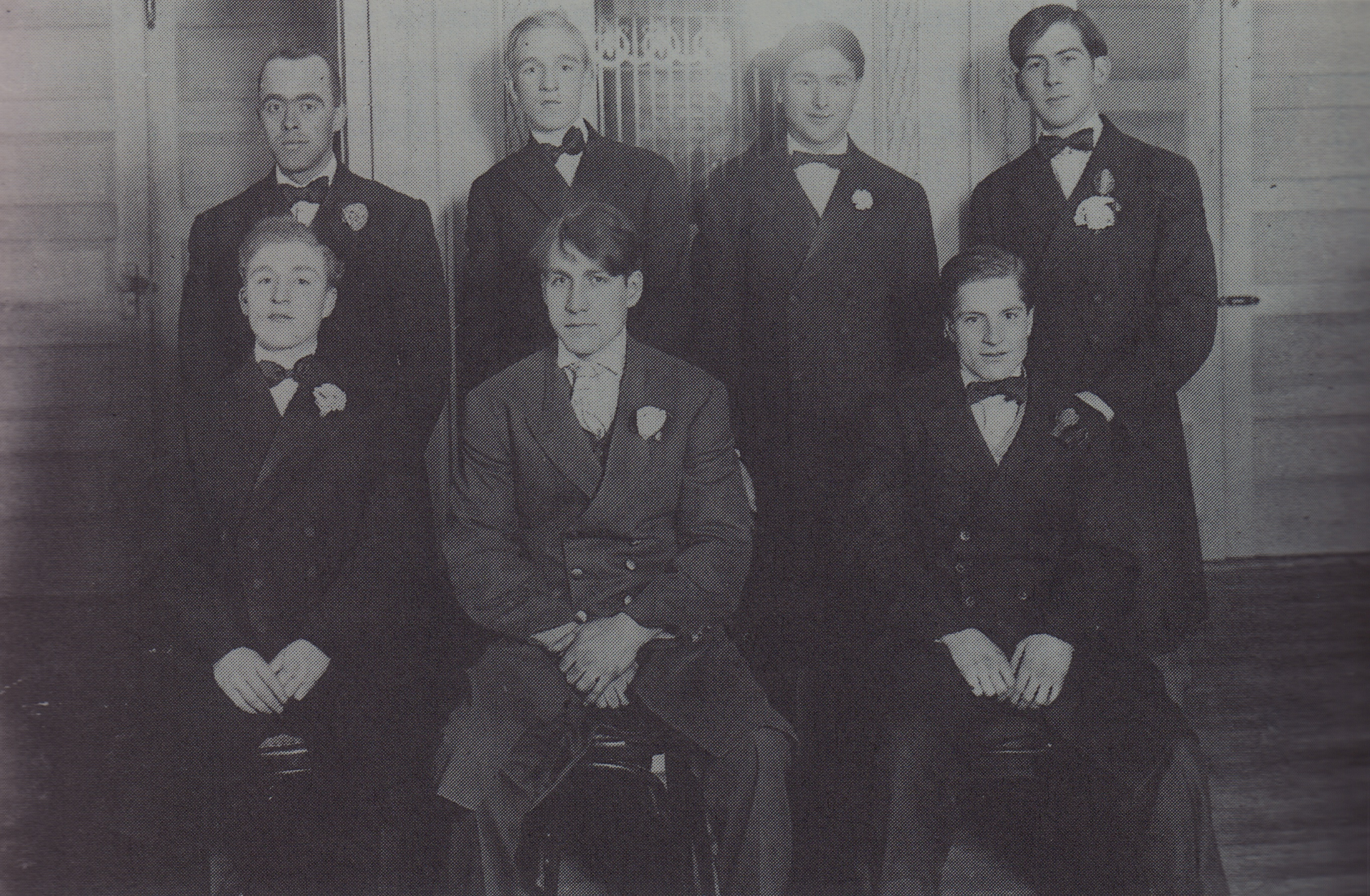
Ushers at the Princess Theatre in Edmonton, Canada in 1915

== History ==
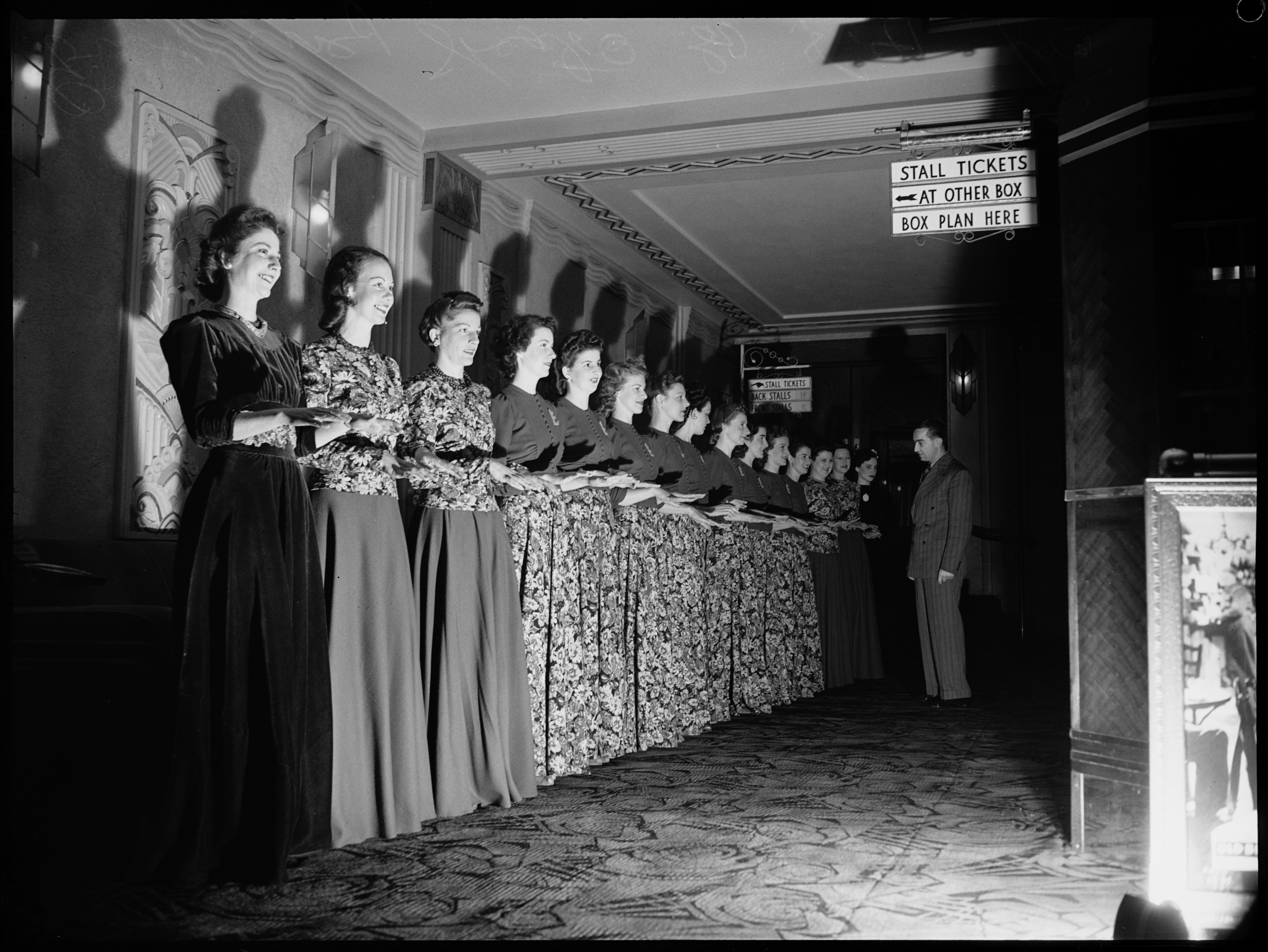
Female ushers, Embassy theatre, Sydney, 1941

The word comes from the Latin ostiarius ("porter", "doorman") through Norman French, and is a cognate of the French huissier.

Ushers were servants or courtiers who showed or ushered visitors in and out of meetings in large houses or palaces.

In the United Kingdom, a variety of titles for courtiers in the Royal Household include the word usher. In England, Wales, Scotland and Ireland, from the early sixteenth century until at least the end of the nineteenth century, the term denoted an assistant to a schoolmaster or head-teacher; an under-master, assistant-master. In such use, however, the term is now rare.

== Duties ==
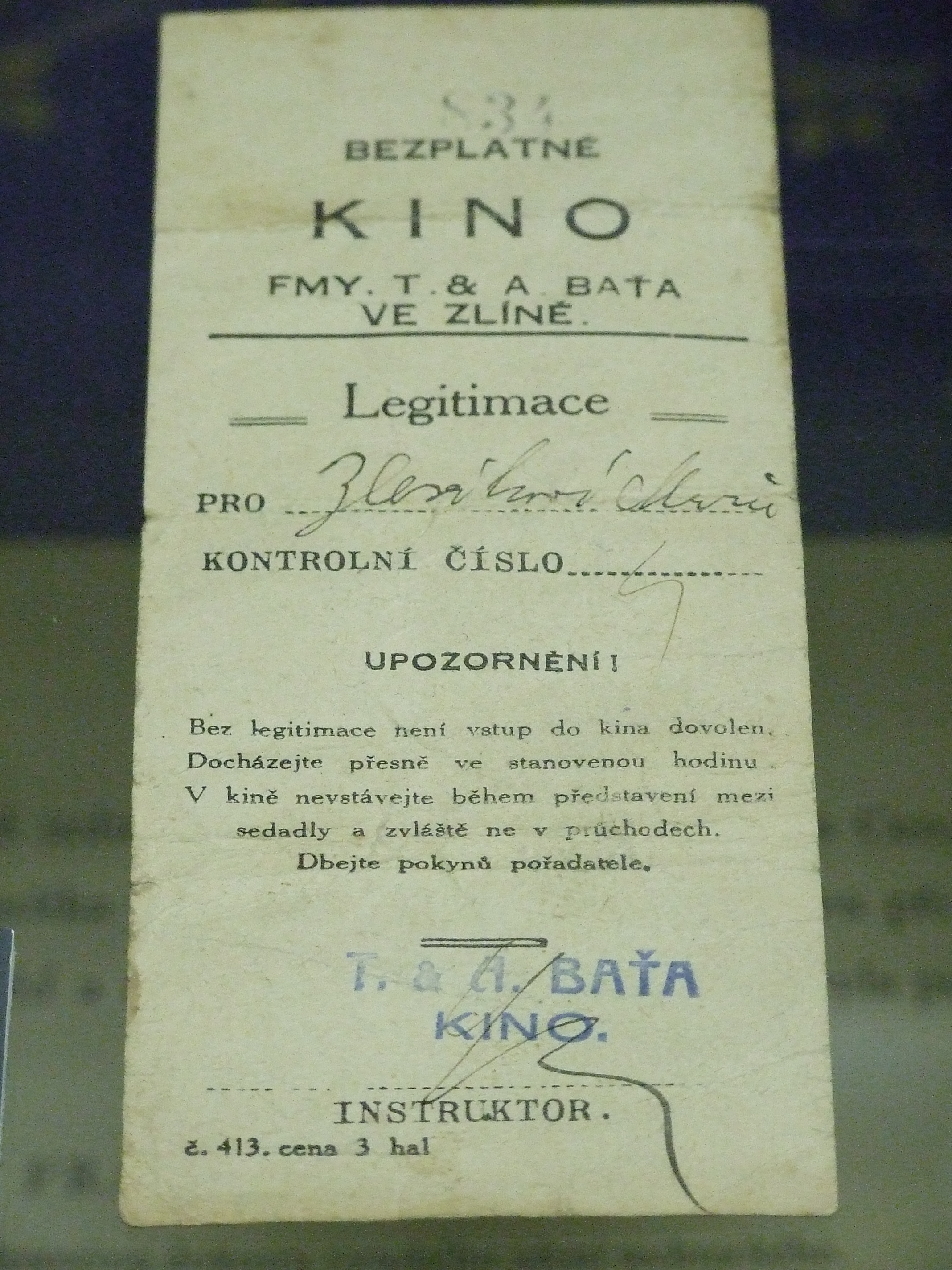
Cinema ticket. The usher checks the tickets in the entrance of cinemas and theaters, directing visitors to their seat and assists people who sit in the wrong place

Ushers assist visitors by formally showing the way in a large building or to their appropriate seats. This may coincide with a security role.

At weddings, friends of the groom and bride may be recruited to direct guests at the ceremony, and generally be available for assistance.

In churches at the beginning of service, ushers welcome, greet and assist people to their desired or available pews. Ushers operate as Security and maintain order. Additional duties include collecting of the offertory and Communion escort if the ushers belong to a Ministry within the church.

Ushers help those in attendance at entertainment and sporting events in theatres and stadiums. Duties include checking tickets, directing people to their assigned seats, distributing programmes, answering questions and assisting people in finding restrooms and refreshments.

According to the United States Department of Labor, ushers, lobby attendants and ticket takers earn an average wage of $8.41 an hour and $17,500 a year. Approximately 102,000 are employed in this line of work. Most of these workers are employed by the motion picture and video industries, secondly they work in the performing arts and sporting events venues.

Other jobs also come under the name 'Usher', such as baseball field personnel. A field usher coordinates not only the baseball diamond grounds but also the stadium itself.

Ushers are also expected to help with security and to ensure that only people with proper authority have access to backstage areas. Ushers also monitor the crowds and can summon security when needed.

In cinemas and theaters, it was common for ushers to check tickets and show people to their seats to watch the film being shown. If actually during the film, when lights were dimmed, the usher would shine a torch to light the row of seating in question.

== Special types of ushers ==
=== Court usher ===
A court usher is a position in a law court. Tasks generally performed by court ushers involve escorting participants to the courtroom, and seeing that they are suitably hydrated, as well as ensuring the secure transaction of legal documents within the courtroom and deciding the order of cases. The roles of an usher may vary with the type of court they serve. In Scottish courts the position is called "court officer" or "bar officer" or, for the higher courts, the "macer".

== See also ==
- Church usher
- The Flick, play about movie ushers
- White House Chief Usher
- Usherette tray
