= Strand Theatre (Manhattan) =

Former movie theater in Manhattan, New York

Coordinates: 40°45′34.81″N 73°59′6.96″W

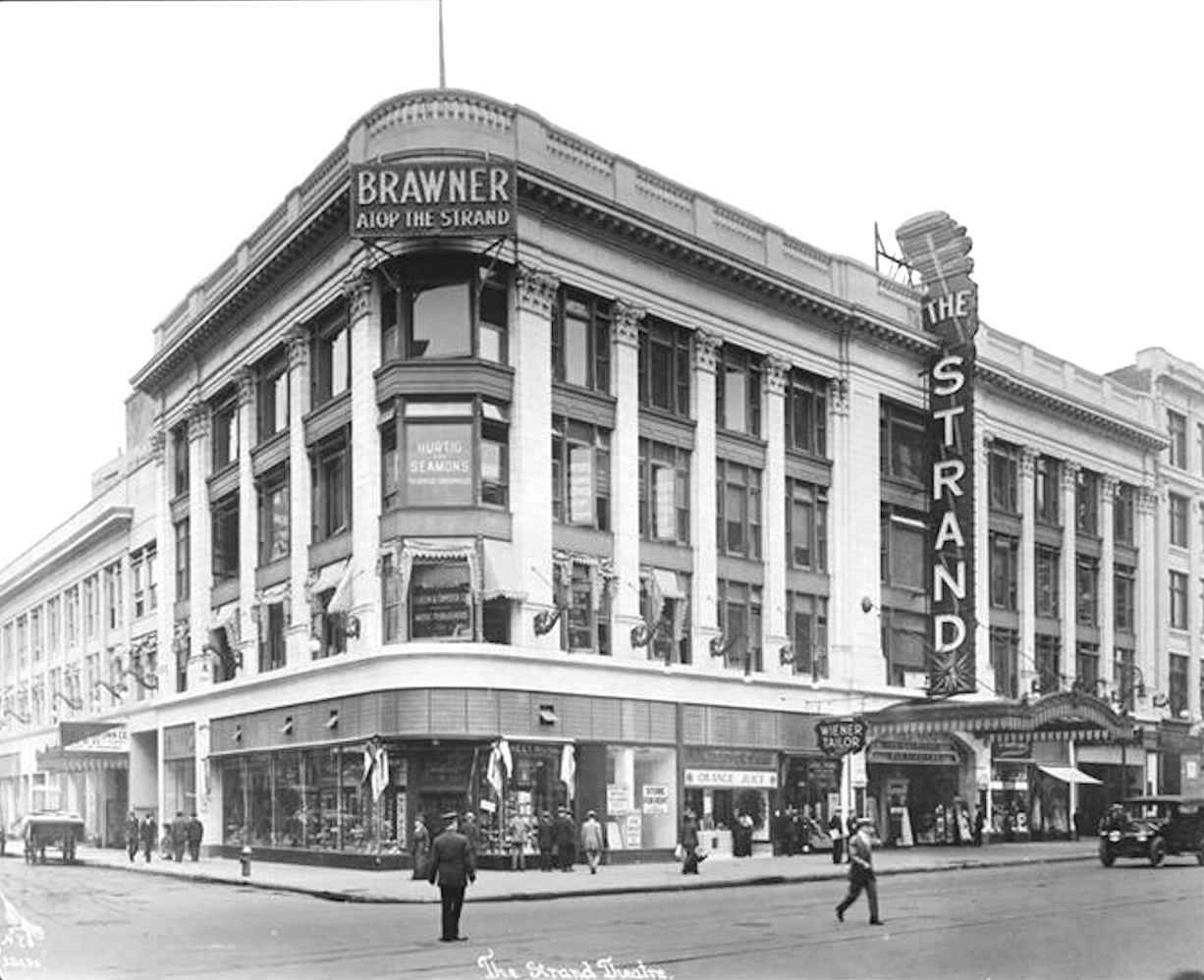
Strand Theatre, June 1914

The Strand Theatre was an early movie palace located at 1579 Broadway, at the northwest corner of 47th Street and Broadway in Times Square, New York City. Opened in 1914, the theater was later known as the Mark Strand Theatre, the Warner Theatre, and the Cinerama Theatre. It closed as the RKO Warner Twin Theatre, and was demolished in 1987.

== History ==
The Strand Theatre was built in 1914 as part of the chain of movie theaters owned by the Mark Brothers, Mitchel and Moe. It cost US$1 million (equivalent to $32,142,857 in 2025) to build and is believed to have been the first lavish movie palace built only to show motion pictures. It was designed by Thomas W. Lamb and served as a model for many other similar theaters built at the time. The New York Times favorably reviewed the opening of the Strand, helping to establish its importance. To manage the theater, Mitchel Mark personally hired Samuel "Roxy" Rothafel. Rothafel developed his luxurious style of presenting films at the Strand which he later perfected at the Capitol and Roxy Theatres, becoming the best known motion picture showman in New York City. The theatre influenced The Strand in Hobart, Tasmania, which was initially intended to be a replica of its New York namesake.

The theatre was under contract and mostly showed films distributed by Paramount Pictures.

In 1926, the Mark Strand became the Warner Strand when Warner Bros. Pictures acquired the theatre to showcase its films on Times Square. It was eventually renamed the Warner Theatre in 1951. After closing for renovation in 1952, the theater reopened as the Warner Cinerama Theatre in 1953 with the widescreen film This Is Cinerama (1952). The Warner was the primary New York home of Cinerama films during the remaining years of the 1950s and in 1963 installed an even larger screen to present such 70mm films as It's a Mad, Mad, Mad, Mad World (1963).

In 1968, the theater was converted into three separate cinemas by RKO Stanley Warner Theatres. The 1,000-seat Warner Cinerama occupied the original theater's main floor. The 1,200-seat Penthouse Theatre occupied the former balcony, and the Cine Orleans was created in the stage house of the old Strand, entered from 47th St. The Cinerama and Penthouse were renamed again in the 1980s as the RKO Warner Twin. The entire building closed on February 8, 1987, and was demolished to make way for the Morgan Stanley Building, part of the redevelopment of Times Square.

Memorable films that had their New York premieres at the Strand include Captain Blood (1935) starring Errol Flynn and Olivia de Havilland, Oliver! (1968), Huckleberry Finn, Black Beauty, Romeo and Juliet (1968), Man of La Mancha (1972) and 1776 (1972).
