= Marcus Loew =

American film businessman (1870–1927)

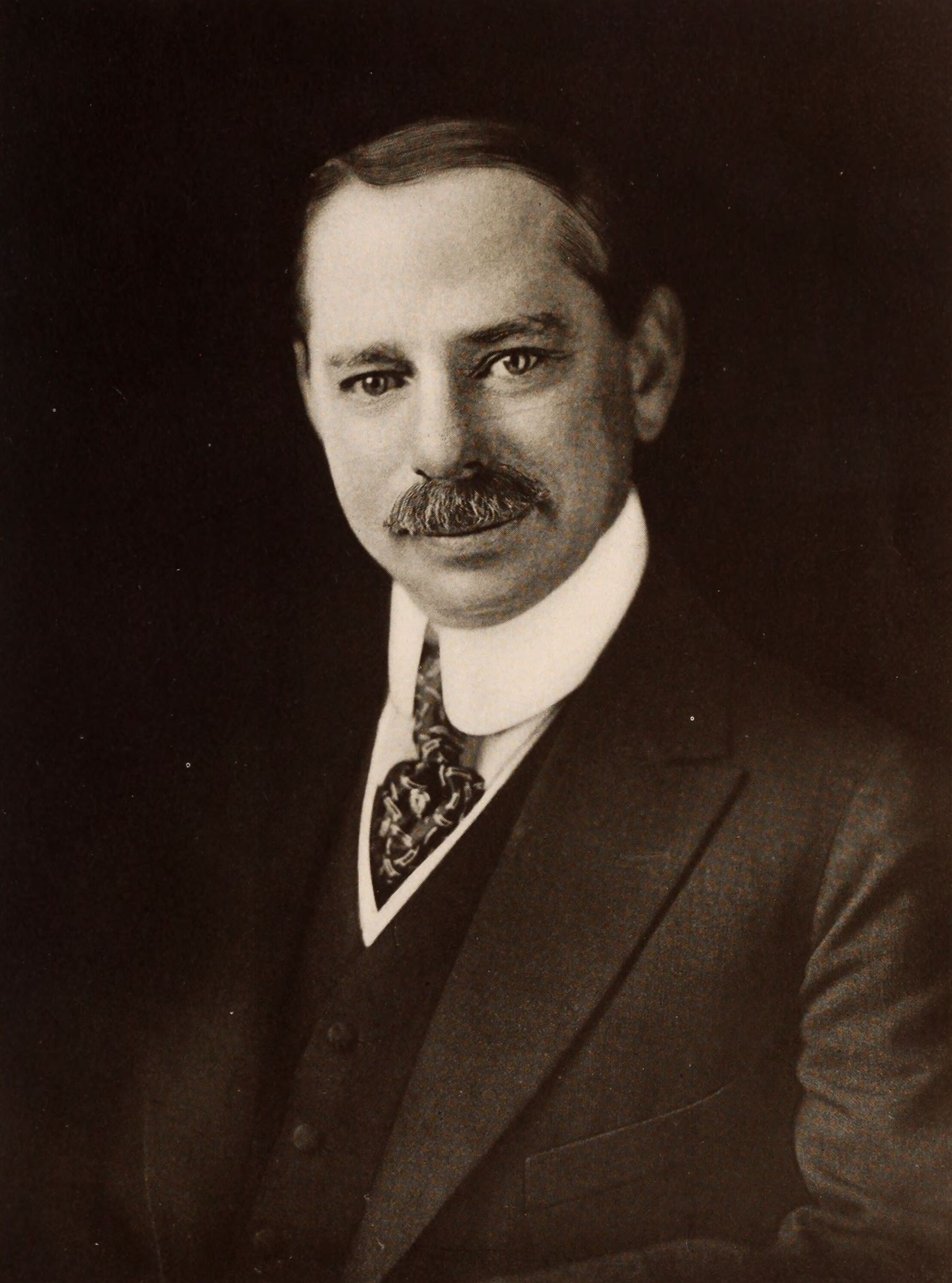
- Loew c. 1924
- Born: May 7, 1870; New York City, New York, U.S.
- Died: September 5, 1927 (aged 57); Glen Cove, New York, U.S.
- Occupation: Film exhibitor
- Known for: Founder of Loews Inc. and MGM
- Title: President
- Successor: Nicholas Schenck
- Spouse: Carrie Loew
- Children: 2, including David
- Family: Arthur Loew Jr. (grandson); Adolph Zukor

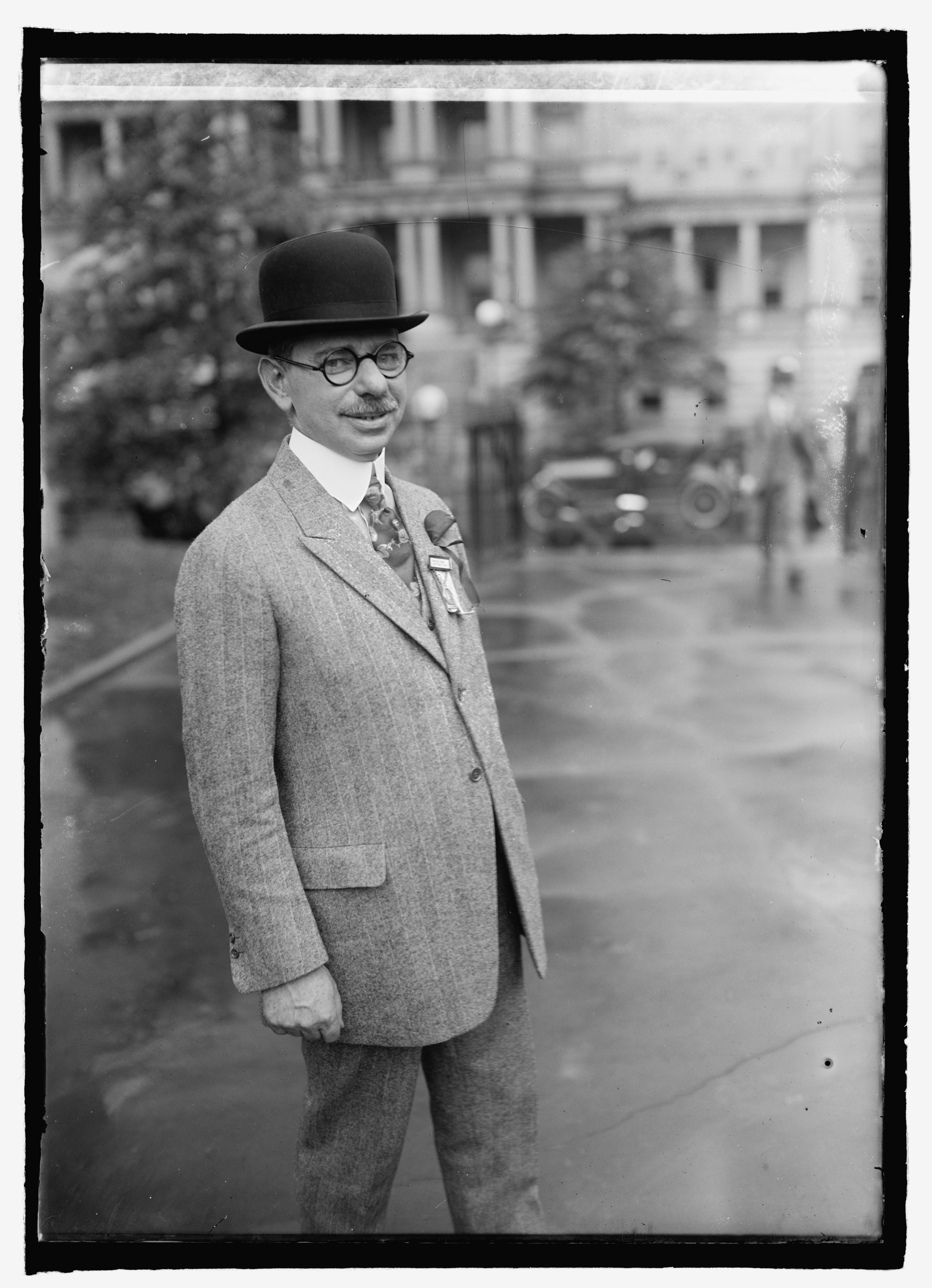
Loew in 1922

Marcus Loew (/loʊ/ LOH; May 7, 1870 – September 5, 1927) was an American business magnate and a pioneer of the motion picture industry who formed Loew's Theatres and the Metro-Goldwyn-Mayer film studio (MGM).

== Life and career ==
Loew was born in New York City on May 7, 1870, into a poor Jewish family, who had emigrated to New York City a few years previously from Austria and Germany. He was forced by circumstances to work at a very young age and had little formal education. Beginning with a small amount of money saved from menial jobs, he invested in the penny arcade business. Shortly after, in partnership with Adolph Zukor and others, he founded the successful but short-lived Automatic Vaudeville Company which established a chain of arcades across several cities. After the company dissolved in 1904 Loew converted his share of the business into nickelodeons and over time he turned Loew's Theatres into a leading chain of vaudeville and movie theaters in the United States.

By 1905, Marcus Loew was on his own and his success eventually meant that he needed a steady flow of films for his theaters. In 1904, he founded the People's Vaudeville Company, a theater chain showcasing one-reel films and live variety shows. In 1910, the company had considerably expanded and was renamed Loew's Consolidated Enterprises. His associates included Adolph Zukor, Joseph Schenck, and Nicholas Schenck. In addition to theaters, Loew and the Schencks expanded the Fort George Amusement Park in upper Manhattan.

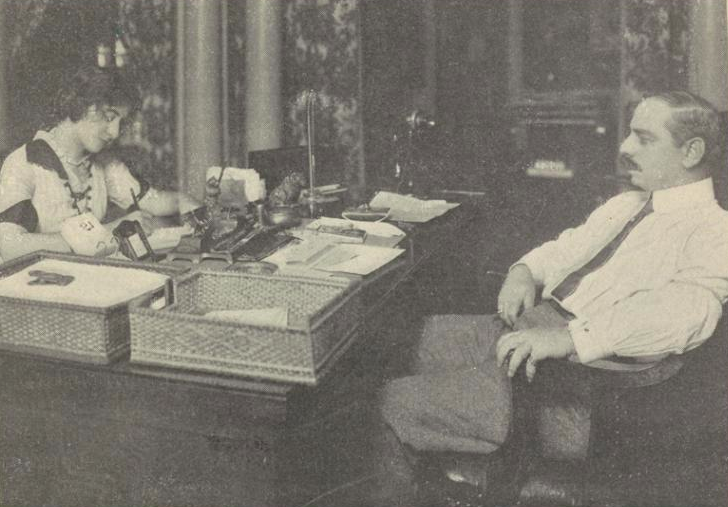
Marcus Loew in his office, ca.1914

By 1913, Loew operated a large number of theaters in New York City including the American Music Hall, Avenue A Theatre, Avenue B Theatre, Broadway Theatre (41st St.), Circle Theatre, and the Columbia Theatre in Brooklyn. Other Loew-operated theaters were the Delancey St. Theatre, Greeley Sq. Theatre, Herald Square Theatre, Liberty Theatre, Brooklyn, Lincoln Sq. Theatre, National Theatre (149th St.), Plaza Theatre, 7th Ave. Theatre (124th St.), Shubert Theatre, Brooklyn, and the Yorkville Theatre. Outside of New York, he managed the Columbia Theatres of both Washington, D.C., and Boston and Philadelphia’s Metropolitan Opera House.

Loew found himself faced with a serious dilemma: his merged companies lacked a central managerial command structure. Loew preferred to remain in New York overseeing the growing chain of Loew's Theatres. Film production had been gravitating toward southern California since 1913. By 1917 he oversaw a number of enterprises: Borough Theatre Co., Empress Amusement Corp., Fort George Amusement Co., Glendive Amusement Corp., Greeley Square Amusement Co., Loew's Consolidated Enterprise, Loew's Theatrical Enterprises, Mascot Amusement Co., Natonia Amusement Co., People's Vaudeville Co. In 1919, Loew reorganized the company under the name Loew's, Inc.

In 1920, Loew purchased Metro Pictures Corporation. A few years later, he acquired a controlling interest in the financially troubled Goldwyn Picture Corporation which at that point was controlled by theater impresario Lee Shubert. Goldwyn Pictures owned the "Leo the Lion" trademark and studio property in Culver City, California. But without its founder Samuel Goldwyn, the Goldwyn studio lacked strong management. With Loew's vice president Nicholas Schenck needed in New York City to help manage the large East Coast movie theater operations, Loew had to find a qualified executive to take charge of this new Los Angeles entity.

Loew recalled meeting a film producer named Louis B. Mayer who had been operating a successful, modest studio in east Los Angeles. Mayer had been making low budget melodramas for a number of years, marketing them primarily to women. Since he rented most of his equipment and hired most of his stars on a per-picture basis, Loew wasn't after Mayer's brick and mortar business; he wanted Mayer and his Chief of Production, the former Universal Pictures executive, Irving Thalberg. Nicholas Schenck was dispatched to finalize the deal that ultimately resulted in the formation of Metro-Goldwyn Pictures in April 1924 with Mayer as the studio head and Thalberg chief of production.

Mayer's company folded into Metro Goldwyn with two notable additions: Mayer Pictures' contracts with key directors such as Fred Niblo and John M. Stahl, and up-and-coming actress Norma Shearer, later married to Thalberg. Mayer would eventually be rewarded by having his name added to the company. Loews Inc. would act as MGM's financier and retain controlling interest for decades.

Loew died in 1927 of a heart attack at the age of 57 at his country home in Glen Cove, New York. Reporting his death, Variety called him "the most beloved man of all show business of all time". He was interred in the Maimonides Cemetery in Brooklyn. He left only one public gift in his will which was to Midtown Hospital.

For his very significant contribution to the development of the motion picture industry, Marcus Loew has a star on the Hollywood Walk of Fame at 1617 Vine Street.

== Personal life ==
He and his wife, Carrie Loew, had twin sons, David L. Loew (1897–1973) and Arthur Marcus Loew Sr (1897–1977). Arthur married Mildred Zukor, daughter of Adolph Zukor and became president of MGM. Their son, Arthur Loew Jr. (1925–1995), was an actor, producer and writer.

== E. M. Loew, unrelated theater operator ==
E. M. (Elias Moses) Loew (1897–1984), also a major theater operator, to a lesser degree, and race track owner, is often assumed to be related to Marcus Loew. They weren't even distantly related. Among other things, E. M. Loew was, with Lou Walters (father of Barbara Walters), co-owner of the Latin Quarter night clubs in Boston, New York, and Miami Beach.
