= Usherette tray =

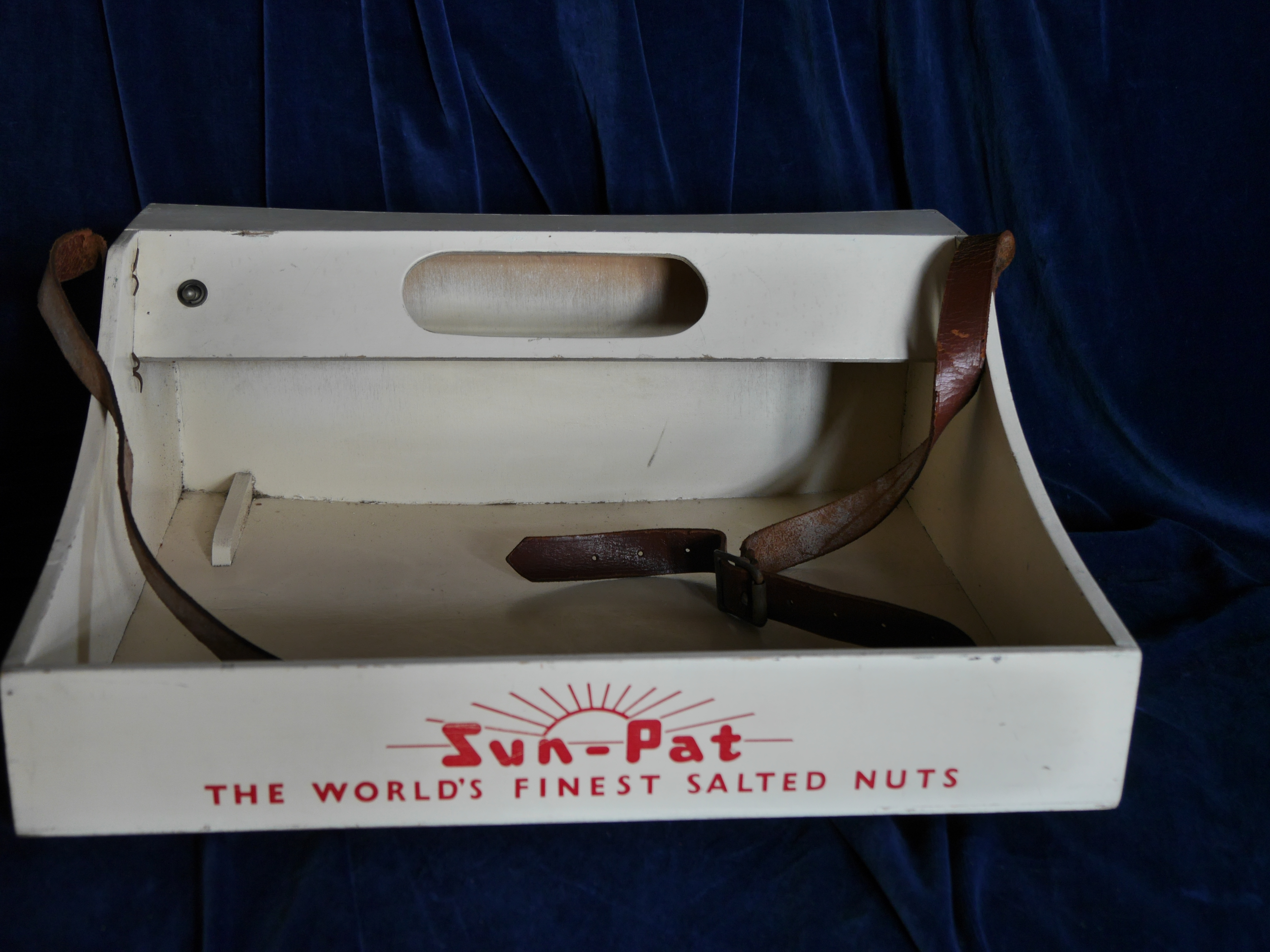
An usherette tray

An usherette tray is the tray in which a cinema or theatre usher or usherette carries ice creams, nuts, chocolate and other sweets for sale to customers during the interval.
