= Automatic Vaudeville Company =

American entertainment company(1903)

The Automatic Vaudeville Company was a short-lived American entertainment business founded in 1903 by Adolph Zukor, David Warfield and Marcus Loew, which owned a chain of penny arcades.

The company opened its first store in Union Square, Manhattan. It was very successful, earning $20,000 in its first year and expanded to other outlets including in Cincinnati. However the owners rapidly had a falling out, and dissolved the company in 1904 dividing up the assets. Both elements of the business provided the basis for the formation of major film studios, as the owners switched from amusement arcades to the rapidly growing movie market. Loew and Warfield's share formed the basis of Loews Incorporated, backer of MGM, while Zukor went on to consolidate Paramount Pictures. The conflict between the two men dating back to their early years reportedly continued for many years.

Another future Hollywood mogul William Fox, the later founder of Fox Film, was inspired by the company's success ito acquiring a penny arcade of his own. He eventually converted it into a nickelodeon and built up a chain into his own film empire.

== Bibliography ==
- Balio, Tino. The American Film Industry. University of Wisconsin Press, 1985.
- Krefft, Vanda. The Man Who Made the Movies: The Meteoric Rise and Tragic Fall of William Fox. HarperCollins, 2017.
- Ingham, John N. Biographical Dictionary of American Business Leaders, Volume 1. Greenwood Publishing Group, 1983.
