= Edisonia Hall =

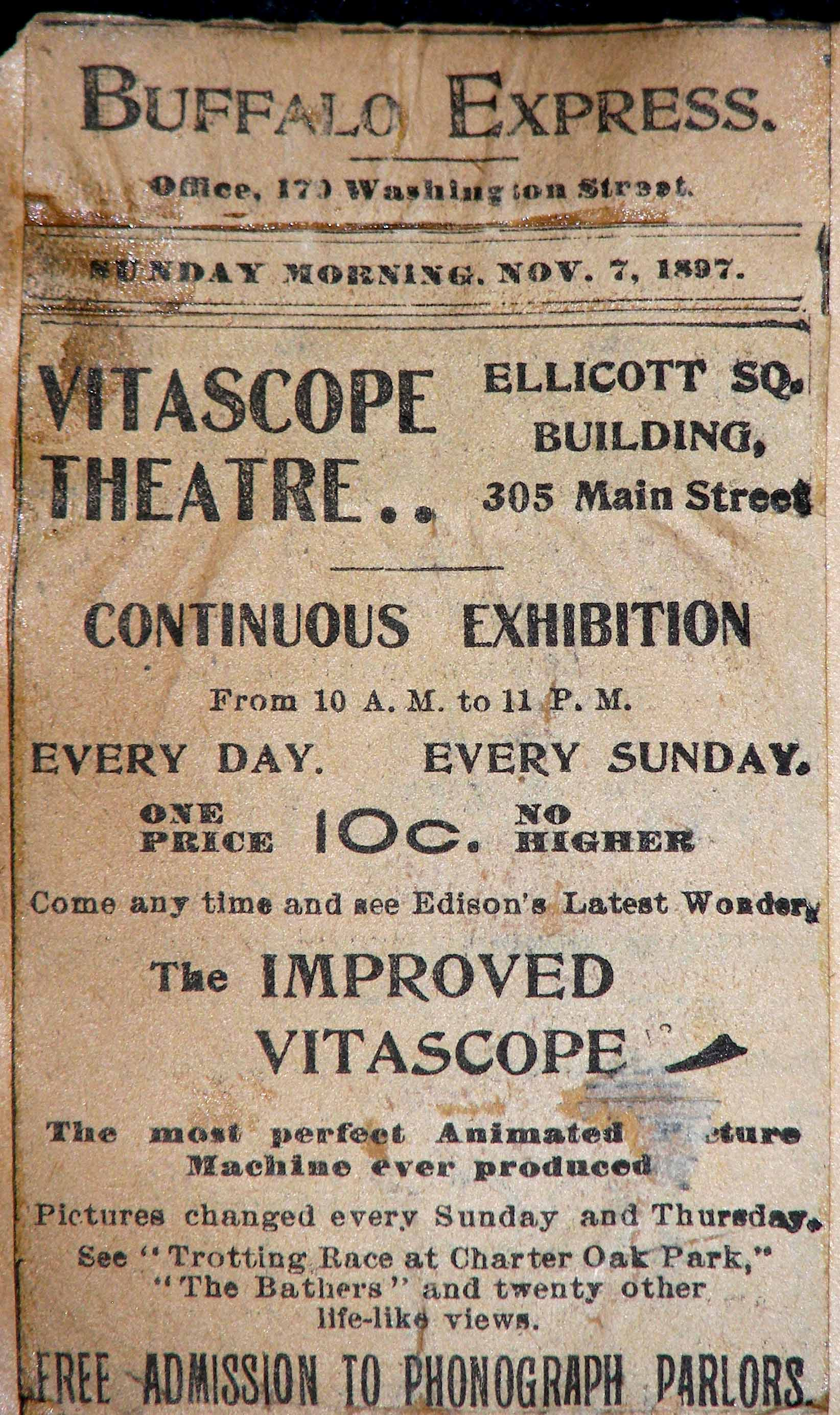
An advertisement for Buffalo's Vitascope Theater from November 1897

Edisonia Hall was a generic name for exhibition halls that displayed the various inventions of Thomas Alva Edison's company. These included the phonograph, the Vitascope, the Kinetoscope and other such devices.

The Edisonia Hall opened by Mitchell Mark and Moe Mark in Buffalo, New York in the Ellicott Square Building on October 19, 1896, had the distinction of hosting a Vitascope Theater (or "Theatre"). This was the first known dedicated, purpose-built motion picture theater in the world. The theater was referred to in newspapers of the day (Buffalo Express, Buffalo News, and others) as Vitascope Theater, Vitascope Hall, and the Electrical Theater.

The majority of the first program of films were Lumiere Films obtained through Pathe Freres. In its first year of existence, more than 200,000 people visited to view motion pictures projected on a screen. The theater remained open for nearly two years, longer than any other early motion picture theater known. On November 25, 2007, the Buffalo News published an article by Mark Sommer confirming the historical significance of this theater.
