= Moe Mark =

American movie theater pioneer (1872–1932)

- Born: 1872; Richmond, Virginia
- Died: November 14, 1932 (age 60)
- Relatives: Mitchel H. Mark (brother)

Moe Mark (1872 – November 14, 1932) was the brother of Mitchel H. Mark. Together they opened the first known permanent, purpose-built motion picture theater in the world, Vitascope Hall a.k.a. Vitascope Theater or Edisonia Hall in 1896 Buffalo, New York, and the first movie palace, the Strand Theatre (1914) in New York City. They founded Mark-Strand chain of theaters which operated dozens of theatres in the United States. His brother died in 1918. In 1926, Mark sold part of the chain to Stanley Company of America (founded by Jules Mastbaum and later run by his wife Etta Wedell Mastbaum) and in 1929, he sold the remainder to Warner Brothers which had purchased the Stanley Company in 1928. In 1953, Warner's theater holdings were spun off as Stanley Warner Theatres and in 1967 merged with RKO Theatres to become RKO-Stanley Warner Theatres.

Moe Mark became a member of the board of Warner Bros. His letters are in the archive at University of Southern California.
