= Palace Theatre (Marion, Ohio) =

Theater and movie theater in Marion, Ohio, United States

- Palace Theatre
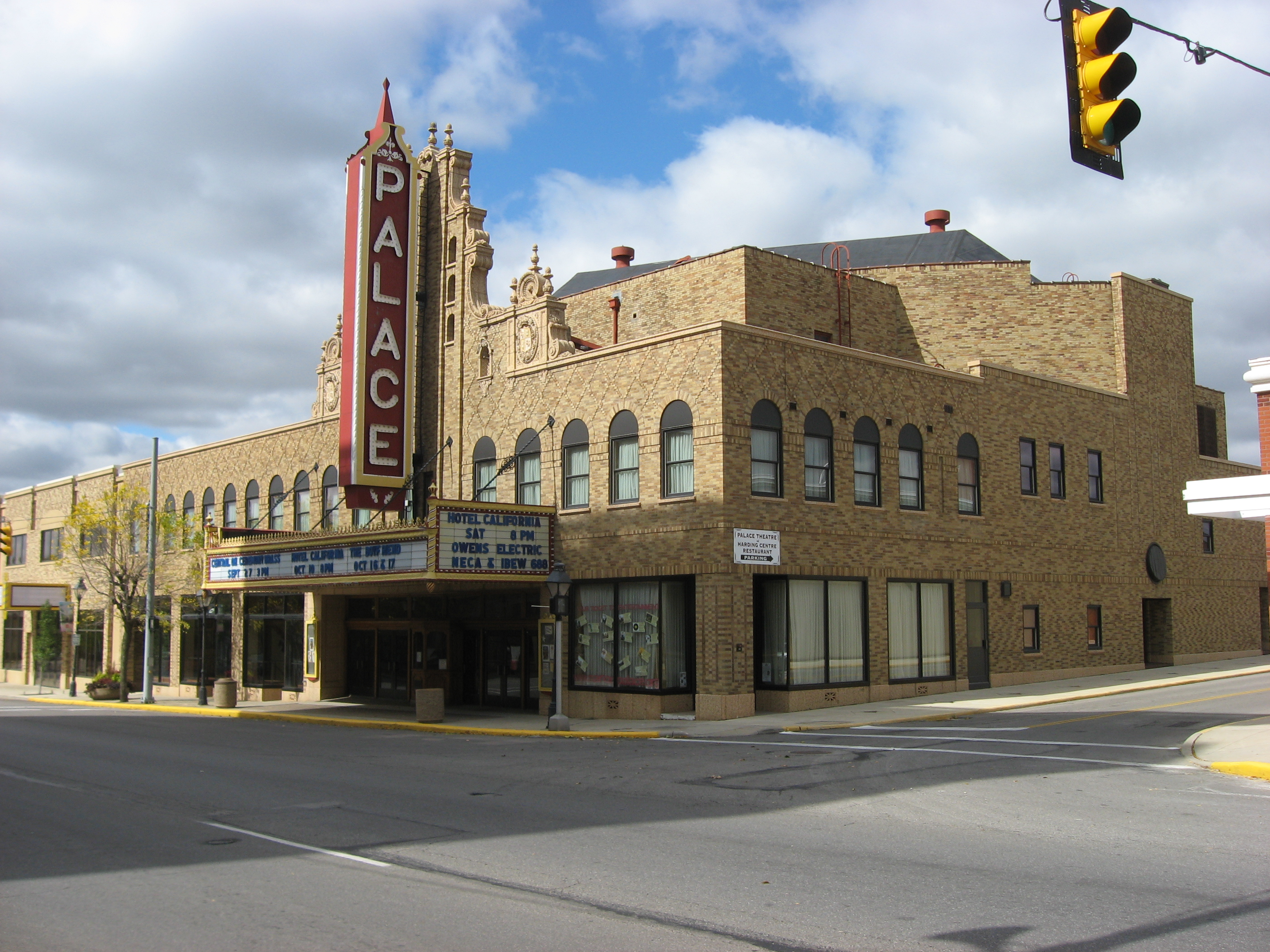
- Marion Palace Theatre, Marion, Ohio
- Interactive map of Palace Theatre
- Address: 233 West Center Street; Marion, Ohio; United States
- Owner: Palace Cultural Arts Association
- Capacity: 1,440
- Type: Movie Palace atmospheric theatre
- Current use: Movie theatre and performing arts center

Construction
- Opened: August 30, 1928
- Rebuilt: 1975–1976; 2015
- Architect: John Eberson

Website
- www.marionpalace.org
- Marion Palace Theatre
- U.S. National Register of Historic Places
- Location within Ohio Location within the United States
- Coordinates: 40°35′19″N 83°8′01″W
- Built: 1928
- Architectural style: Late 19th and 20th century Spanish Revival, atmospheric theatre
- NRHP reference No.: 76001486
- Added to NRHP: March 26, 1976

The Marion Palace Theatre is a movie palace constructed in 1928 in Marion, Ohio, United States for the Young Amusement Company. The original cost of the project was $500,000 ($7.5 million in 2021 dollars). It is listed on the National Register of Historic Places because of its significance to the atmospheric theatre architectural style popular in the United States during the 1920s.

The theatre opened on August 30, 1928, becoming the company's tenth theatre. A movie palace, it was one of the last to be built in the atmospheric theatre style in the United States. In addition to motion pictures and newsreels, the theatre also booked vaudeville and legitimate theatre, although vaudeville had declined in popularity by the time the theatre opened.

It is located at the corner of West Center Street and Campbell Street, on two former residential lots. The site was initially owned by the Campbell family, early Marion settlers. The lot slopes to the west, causing the stage to be below grade level on the east and at grade level on the west. The east lot was vacant at the time of construction, while the west lot had a residential house, which was razed. Over time, additional land was secured and added to the complex.

In 1975, the theatre was sold to the Palace Cultural Arts Association, a nonprofit organization, and renovated. The Palace remains open today as a movie and performing arts center, and is one of 16 atmospheric theatres designed by John Eberson that remain in operation as theatres in the United States.

== Architecture ==
The Marion Palace was designed by John Eberson as an atmospheric theatre. Eberson designed it to fit the vision of owner V.U. Young for "A Spanish Castle" or "A Palace in Old Spain." It is difficult to assign an Eberson theatre to a precise architectural style. Eberson "mixed architectural styles, more interested in evoking an impression than precisely replicating an architectural period." The theatre is best described as designed in the Spanish Colonial Revival architecture style. Spanish Colonial Revival was popular in Florida during the 1920s, and features arches, terra-cotta roof tiles, towerlike structures, balconies, ornamental ironwork, courtyards, patios and arcades. The design influence of the Spanish architect José Benito de Churriguera is prevalent. This Churrigueresque revival style is seen in the pillars to the right of the stage, the proscenium details, and in Eberson's use of balustrades, stucco shells and garlands. The outside is designed to resemble a palace exterior. Inside, Eberson transitions the patrons from a lobby through wooden doors to an arcade (at the rear of the orchestra) and into a courtyard on a hill. From the balcony, patrons are surrounded by a Spanish town wall and have the same view a resident would have from a high building looking down on the courtyard. A blue sky above creates the impression of open space. Stars are designed in constellation patterns in the ceiling and twinkle through holes in the plaster during performances. A Brenkert Brenograph Jr. projector, hidden in the east side wall, projects clouds on the ceiling, further creating an outdoor illusion.

== Opening night ==
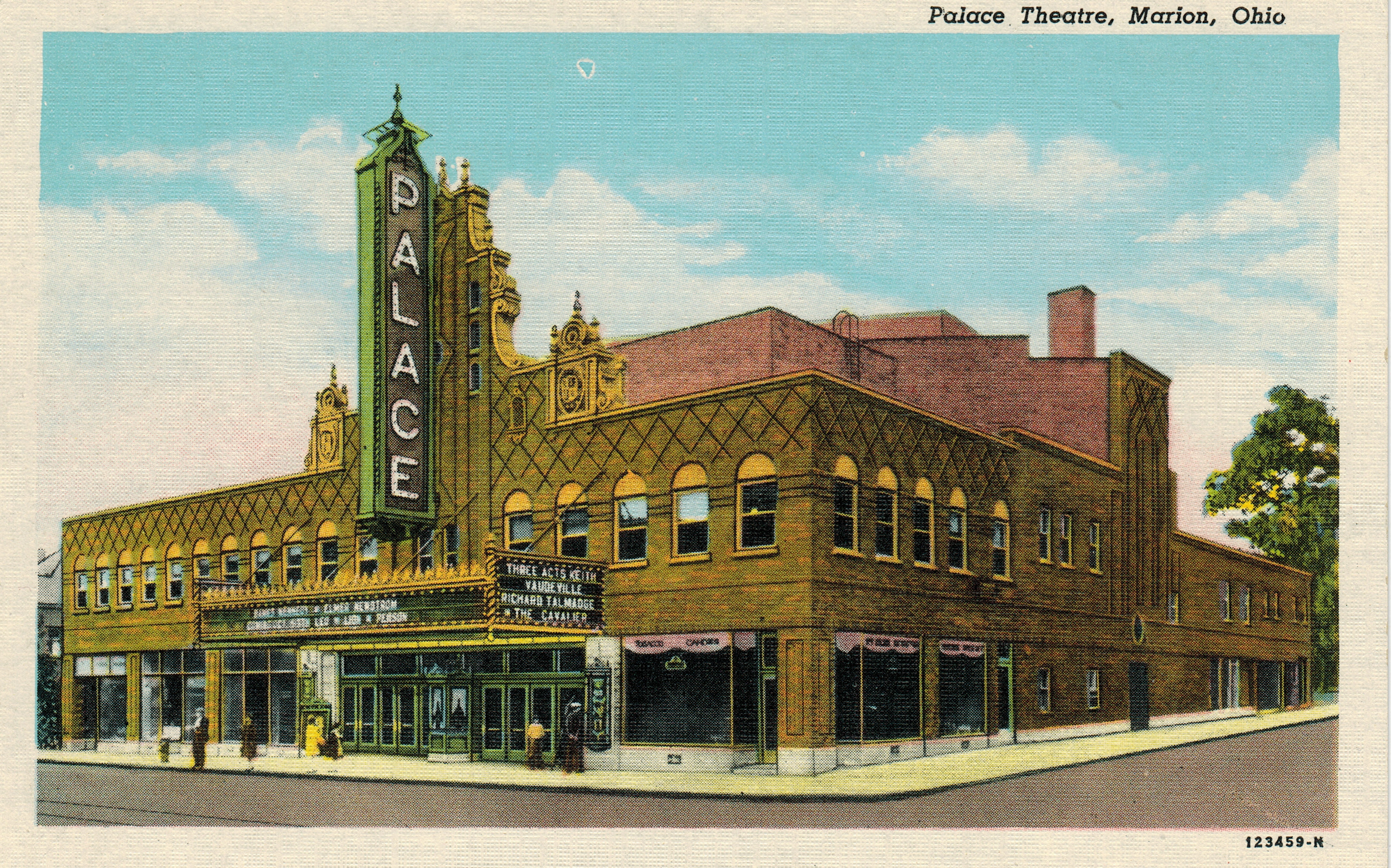
Marion Palace Theatre Exterior c. 1928. Medical offices and a hair salon were located on the second floor and retail shops were located on the first floor.

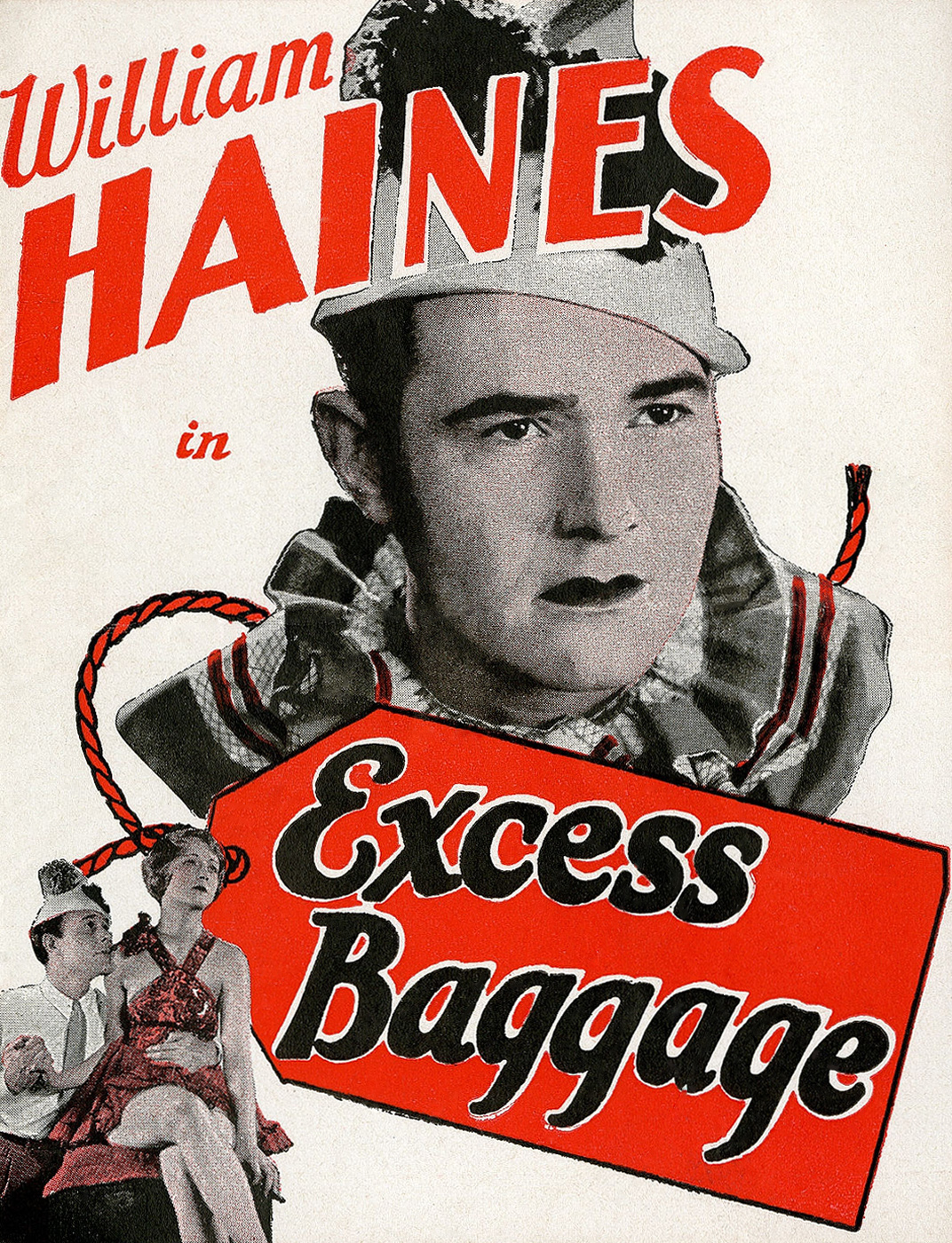
Poster for Excess Baggage, part of the opening night bill

On August 30, 1928, the Marion Palace Theatre opened to a packed house for two performances. At the first performance, Colonel George B. Christian gave a brief opening address. The father of President Warren G. Harding's secretary, George B. Christian Jr., the elder Christian was actively involved in Marion's civic life. His remarks included a short history of theatres in Marion, and he praised the beauty of the building. John Eberson then made a few remarks and introduced Young. He presented Young with a bag of birdseed, a tongue-in-cheek reference to the stuffed pigeons that Eberson had installed to create the feeling of being outdoors at the Palace. The entertainment began with organ music by Banks Kennedy, a well-known Chicago organist. He had written a new composition, which he titled "Everybody's Welcome to the Palace." Next was a theatre overture, "A Night in the Clock Store," by the Palace Orchestra under the direction of Elmer Newstrom. Four vaudeville acts followed: Harry Kahne, a nationally known mental wizard; Tilyou and Rogers, a comedy team; Johnny Mack and Company (including Ethel Dunton, Dolly Moran and Shirley Manion); and the Castlemans, a trio of entertainers. Following the live acts, a Metro-Goldwyn-Mayer silent picture, Excess Baggage (1928 film), starring William Haines, Josephine Dunn and Ricardo Cortez, was shown. The film is now lost. The owner had hoped to open the theatre with the new "talkie" equipment. While the theatre was pre-wired for sound motion pictures, the equipment did not arrive until the following year.

Upon opening in 1928, the theatre was immediately embraced by patrons. The day before the opening, the local newspaper, The Marion Star described the Palace:

Forget for a few minutes that you are reading a copy of your evening paper. Allow your imagination to carry you to the gentle slope of a moon-lit Spanish hill. Before you rise [sic] a vine covered garden wall, broken here and there with graceful arches. Through the archways spreads the soft light of a harvest moon and the dim glow casts shadows over the somber colored walls. Overhead myriads of stars are twinkling in an azure blue sky and soft, fleecy clouds are drifting gently with the breeze. Picture all this in your mind and you have a fair conception of the interior of the Palace theater—Marion's new half million dollar playhouse. The new theater is Spanish in design in all its details. From the walls and the mural decorations to the reproduction of period furniture in the lounges the Spanish design is followed. ... the designer of the theater has let his fancy take full flight. Here and there patches of red brick appear, as through [sic] the plaster had fallen from the walls. A niche in the wall is cleverly adapted to hold a drinking fountain. The view from the balcony is even better than the lower floor. As in the lower floor view of the stage is unobstructed by pillars. [T]he balcony being of cantilever construction removes the necessity of supporting it with posts and pillars which necessarily cut off the view of the unfortunate patron who is forced to sit behind one.

== Pietro Caproni statues ==
Plaster cast of Antinous, from the P.P. Caproni & Brother catalog. Several Caproni casts are placed throughout the Palace.

The illusion of a courtyard setting is further enhanced by the beautiful plaster cast statues that are strategically placed throughout the Palace. Almost all of these are originals produced by Pietro Caproni (1862–1928) and his firm, P.P. Caproni and Brother. With his brother, Emilio, the Caproni firm supplied plaster cast sculptures to schools, museums and theatres throughout America, including Symphony Hall, Boston. Eberson used them in all of his atmospheric theatres. Caproni believed that "the quality of a reproduction is of the greatest importance. In an original work of merit there is a subtleness of treatment—a certain feeling which, if captured in reproduction, places the finished piece within the realm of art itself." The statues installed at the Palace are castings of classical Greek and Roman works, including the Praying Boy, the Capitoline Antinous, Doryphoros and Diana of Versailles. A casting of Lorado Taft's George Washington, dressed in Revolutionary War clothing is located in a balcony niche.

The image to the right is a representation of the Caproni casting for the Capitoline Antinous, which is located at the Palace in a niche in the upper right hand corner of the north wall, above the proscenium. To the left of this statue is a Caproni plaster casting of the Praying Boy.

== Theatre organ ==
A Page Rainbo Gold organ was installed when the Palace opened. Manufactured by the Page Organ Company of Lima, Ohio, it was first played by Banks Kennedy, who was the guest organist at the Palace until December 1928. At the opening, the Marion Star described the Page organ to its readers:

Organs of exquisite tone and ornate appearance have become one of the outstanding features of motion picture houses and the management of Marion's new playhouse invested a huge sum in obtaining one of the best on the market. The organ is custom made being designed especially for the Marion theater. The size of the building and its acoustic properties were taken into consideration before any work was done on the musical instrument. Every bit of material going into the construction of the organ was carefully selected coming from many lands. Many weeks of work were necessary before the instrument was completed and ready to install. The heart of the organ rests in the switchboard. Keys operate silver and bronze contacts making instantaneous connections with the pipes and other effects. The pipes are cleverly concealed on each side of the stage, the opening forming double windows leading to balconies of two Spanish towers. The chambers form a natural part of the architecture of the interior. The console is the only part of the huge organ visible. It rests on a platform that can be raised and lowered bringing the console up to a point where it can be viewed to a great advantage all over the house or lowered to a point where it does not interfere with the view of the stage. The elevator is controlled by a motor located in a soundproof room back of the stage. The console itself is known as the Page Rainbo Gold deriving its name from the finish. It is heavily scrolled and so finished that lights are reflected in a very effective fashion.

That organ was sold and was replaced in 1976 with a 3/10 Mighty Wurlitzer Theatre Pipe Organ. It started its life as the second organ of the 1,200 seat Mars Theatre (now the Long Center for the Performing Arts) in Lafayette, Indiana. When that theatre opened in 1921, it owned a 3/10 Smith-Geneva pipe organ that lasted in the theatre just three years. In 1924, a 3/10 Wurlitzer was installed, and remained in the theatre until the early 1960s, when it was purchased by the former national president of the American Theatre Organ Society, Al Mason, and installed in his Michigan home. Following his death, this instrument was moved to the Marion Palace.

== Restoration ==
The theatre building was completely restored in 1975–1976 after ownership was transferred to a local nonprofit group, the Palace Cultural Arts Association, under the leadership of John Keggan and his Palace Guard. John Eberson's son, Drew Eberson, helped guide the restoration. At that time, the theatre seats were renovated and some were removed to create handicapped-accessible space. The theatre now has seating for 1420 patrons (originally the theatre had seats for 1540 patrons). When the theatre opened, retail space was rented to four businesses on the street level and a medical clinic and beauty shop on the second floor level. These spaces were remodeled for a concession stand, a box office, theatre offices and multi-purpose spaces.

Since 1976, the building has undergone a series of structural, backstage and front of house improvements. In 2015, repair of the front façade and signage began, including work to replace bricks and terra cotta damaged by water.

== Theatre archives ==
The Palace Cultural Arts Association maintains a small archive of Palace artifacts and photos. Also, the Marion County Historical Society maintains a collection of Palace photographs and theatre memorabilia. Finally, the Theatre Historical Society of America has a collection of Palace photographs.

A program from 1928, part of the Palace Cultural Arts Association collection

== Hiroshi Sugimoto ==
The Palace Theatre is one of the movie palaces photographed by Hiroshi Sugimoto (杉本博司, Sugimoto Hiroshi), a Japanese photographer. In 1978, Sugimoto's Theatres series involved photographing old American movie palaces and drive-ins with a folding 8x10 camera and tripod, opening his camera shutter and exposing the film for the duration of the entire feature-length movie, the film projector providing the sole lighting.

== The Singin' Cowboy premiere ==
The musical The Singin' Cowboy had its world premiere in August 2011 at the theatre under the direction of former Marion Palace Theatre executive director and first artistic director Tina Salamone. It ran for 6 performances.

== Current use ==
The theatre is owned by the members of a nonprofit corporation and is governed by a board of directors. The board is elected by members at an annual meeting. The theatre presents an annual small season of touring artists and an educational theatre series for schoolchildren. During the off-season and at other times during the year when the theatre would otherwise be dark, amateur theatre and high school productions use the venue. The theatre also exhibits motion pictures and is available for rent.
