= Majestic Theatre (San Antonio) =

Movie theater in San Antonio, Texas

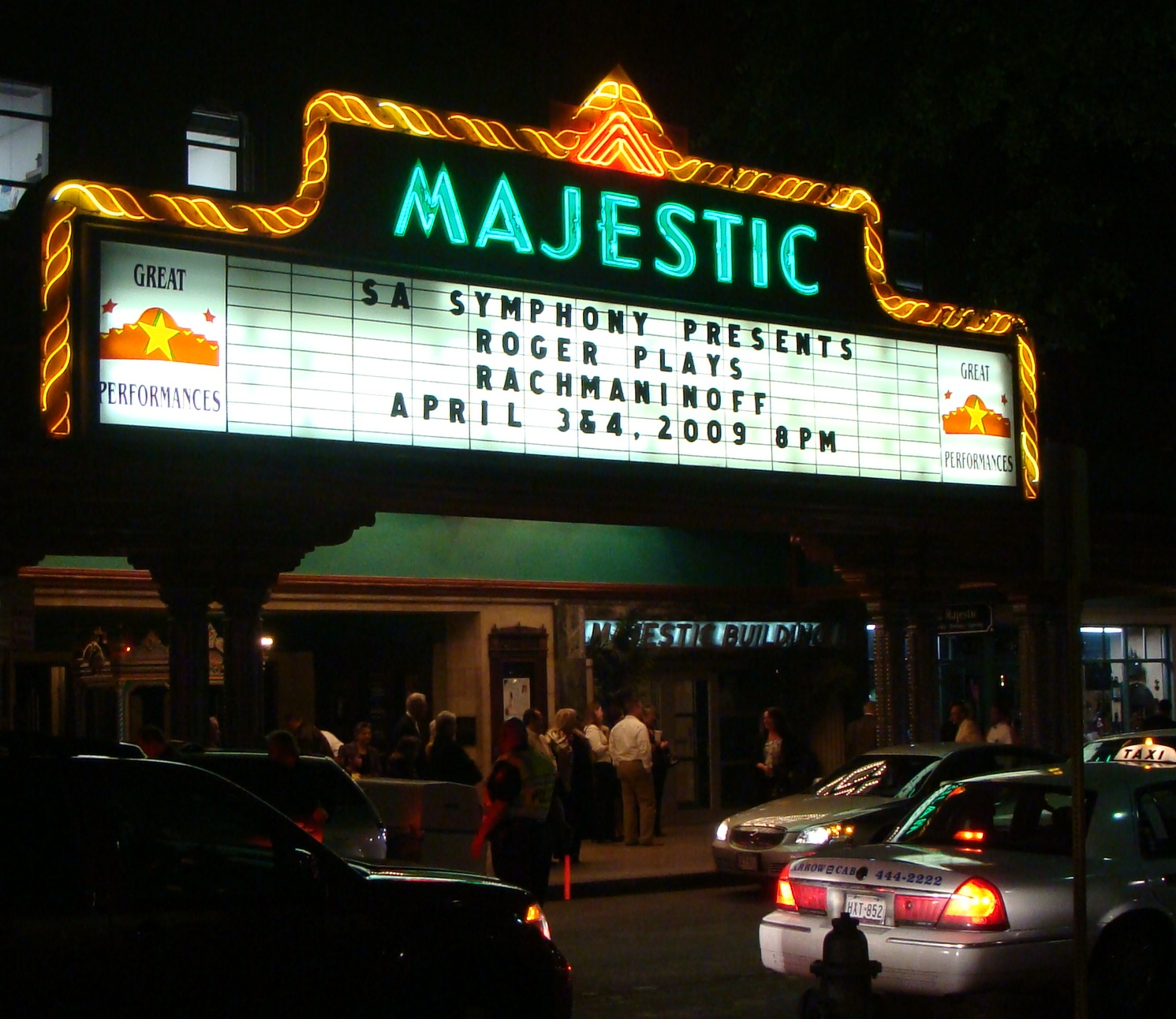
- Interactive map of Majestic Theatre
- Address: 224 E. Houston Street; San Antonio, Texas; United States
- Owner: City of San Antonio
- Operator: ATG Entertainment
- Capacity: 2,264

Construction
- Opened: June 14, 1929
- Reopened: 1989

Tenant
- Las Casas Foundation

Website
- us.atgtickets.com/venues/majestic-theatre/whats-on/
- Majestic Theatre
- U.S. National Register of Historic Places
- U.S. National Historic Landmark
- Recorded Texas Historic Landmark
- Location within Texas Location within the United States
- Coordinates: 29°25′34″N 98°29′24″W
- Built: 1929
- Architect: Eberson, John
- Architectural style: Skyscraper, Mission/Spanish Revival
- NRHP reference No.: 75001952
- RTHL No.: 5972

Significant dates
- Added to NRHP: October 1, 1975
- Designated RTHL: 1991

The Majestic Theatre is San Antonio's oldest and largest atmospheric theatre. The theatre seats 2,264 people and was designed by architect John Eberson, for Karl Hoblitzelle's Interstate Theatres in 1929.

In 1975, the theatre was listed on the National Register of Historic Places and was designated a Texas Historic Landmark in 1991 and a National Historic Landmark April 19, 1993. The theatre was home to the San Antonio Symphony from 1989 to 2014. For many years, it remained the largest theatre in Texas and the second largest movie theatre in the United States. It was also the first theatre in the state to be totally air-conditioned.

== History ==
The land on which the office building-theatre complex now stands was leased to Karl Hoblitzelle from J. M. Nix, who had purchased it in 1920 from the Enterprise Company of Dallas. The land came with the curious deed restriction that, until April 5, 1928, "'neither aforesaid land nor any building or improvement or any part thereon shall be used or occupied for theatrical, motion picture, or amusement purposes at any time...'"

Sufficiently exceeding the listed time restriction, the theatre's opening on June 14, 1929, in many ways symbolized a progressiveness with which San Antonio wished to identify. The city actually deemed the month of the opening "Prosperity Month," celebrating the recent era of development Texas was experiencing. In size, the Greater Majestic was second in the nation only to Atlanta, Georgia's Fox Theatre, and it was the first theatre in Texas to be fully air-conditioned, something that alone was a major attraction in the 1920s South. Advertisements heralding "'an acre of cool, comfortable seats'" were "further emphasized by the snow which topped the letters of the theatre's name," prompting society women to wear fur coats to the June opening. The 4,000-seat theatre was filled to capacity for opening day entertainment, which consisted of the musical film, Follies of 1929 and live performances by Mexican Troubador Don Galvan, "The Banjo Boy," the "Seven Nelsons" acrobatic troupe, Eddie Sauer and his "Syncopaters," and the Father of Country Music, Jimmie Rodgers, who himself received 18 curtain calls. Each week, the program offered included a new film and a new lineup of star performers. In 1930, the Great Depression caused the Majestic to close for several weeks, until it was able to reopen "because Americans were turning to movies for escape." The Majestic provided that escape with a schedule of films and live entertainment through the 1940s and 50s.

Majestic Theatre's features included a huge cast-iron canopy covering the sidewalk, a vertical sign 76-feet tall topped with "a strutting peacock ... walking as a huge ball rotated under his feet," and a cave-like single-story lobby that included copper lanterns, ceiling murals, and an aquarium filled with tropical fish. Inside the theatre's auditorium were stuffed birds perched on balconies or frozen mid-flight via ceiling wire, replicas of well-known Greek, Roman, and Renaissance sculptures, and specially treated cypress trees brought from Spain and placed on upper-level niches. The Baroque tendency to decorate with mask-like faces is exemplified by carvings alongside the stage and under the mezzanine balcony, and in direct translation of atmospheric theater design, the Majestic's blue ceiling "cloud scape" disguises the interior dome as an evening sky in conjunction with a cloud projector and small bulbs simulating stars. The bulbs are actually positioned according to consultations with experts at the National Geographic Society, who instructed the designer as to the positioning of the real stars on the night of the theater's opening.

In January 2017, the Majestic replaced the white peacock, which had tarnished gray and become "decrepit" over the years with a new one purchased for $3,600 from Joel Donahue, a California taxidermist. There are twenty-seven other stuffed birds in the theatre, including a second, less ostentatious peacock on the opposite side of the new addition. At the Majestic grand opening in 1929, the facility was billed as having "one of the largest collections of stuffed birds in Texas," including a large white peacock. Later in 2017, the theatre hosted the San Antonio portions of Hand in Hand: A Benefit for Hurricane Relief.

== Premieres ==
The world premiere of West Point of the Air (1935) was held at the Majestic on March 22, 1935.

The world premiere of The Texans (1938) was held at the Majestic on July 16, 1938.

The world premiere of The Lusty Men (1952) was held at the Majestic in 1952 with stars Robert Mitchum, Arthur Kennedy and Arthur Hunnicutt attending. Selena (1997) starring Jennifer Lopez was filmed inside the theatre.

The world premiere of To Hell and Back (1955) was held at the Majestic on August 17, 1955. In the movie Texan Audie Murphy plays himself as World War II's most decorated combat soldier. The premiere was held on the tenth anniversary of Murphy's army discharge at Fort Sam Houston in San Antonio.

The world premiere of The Alamo (2004) was held at the Majestic on March 27, 2004 with Dennis Quaid, Billy Bob Thornton, Jason Patric, Patrick Wilson, Emilio Echevarria, Jordi Molla, native Texan writer/director John Lee Hancock and Academy Award-winning producer Mark Johnson in attendance.

== Gallery ==
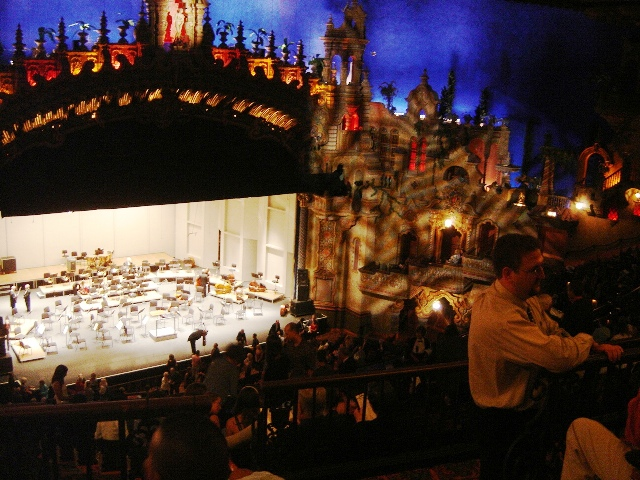

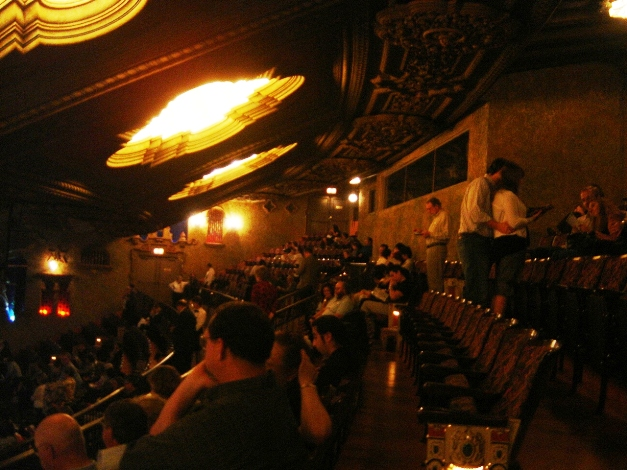

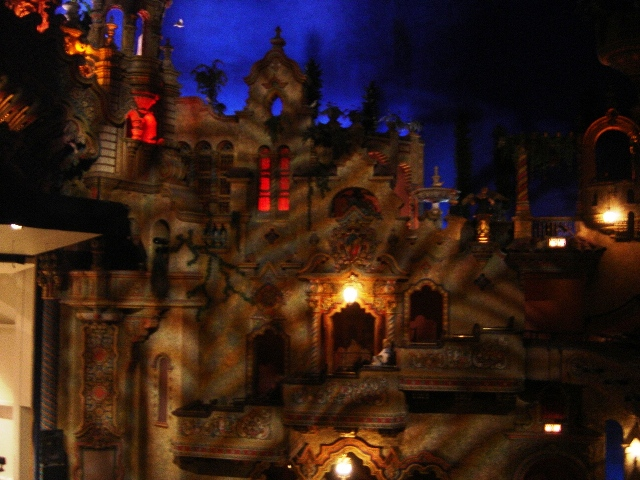

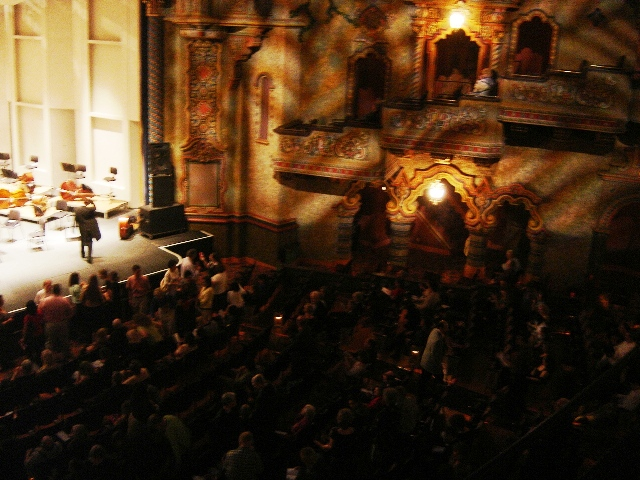
