= The Broadway Cinema (Prestwick) =

Historic cinema owned by charity

Coordinates: 55°29′55″N 4°36′41″W

- Interactive map of the The Broadway Cinema area

General information
- Location: 80 Main Street, Prestwick, Scotland
- Opened: 29 April 1935
- Owner: Friends of the Broadway Prestwick

Design and construction
- Architect: Alister Gladstone MacDonald

The Broadway Cinema is an Art Deco category C-listed building in Prestwick, South Ayrshire, Scotland. Opened on 29 April 1935, the Broadway has operated as a cinema, bingo hall, and leisure centre, before a period of dereliction ending with the acquisition of the building by registered charity Friends of the Broadway Prestwick on 29 April 2024.

== History ==
=== Alister Gladstone MacDonald ===
The Broadway was designed by architect Alister Gladstone MacDonald, eldest son of the UK's first Labour prime minister, James Ramsay MacDonald, and his wife Margaret Ethel MacDonald (née Gladstone), a feminist and social reformer who served on the executive of the National Union of Women's Suffrage Societies. MacDonald volunteered with the Friends Ambulance Unit during World War I, before returning to Britain to study architecture. He graduated from University College London in 1926, becoming a member of the Royal Institute of British Architects (RIBA), and becoming a Donaldson medallist at the Bartlett School of Architecture. MacDonald then travelled to the US to study skyscraper design in New York City, and sound insulation and lighting design in Hollywood, where he made acquaintance with Charlie Chaplin.

=== Construction (1934–1935) ===
The Broadway was constructed with a recessed three-storey tower as the central section flanked by two-storey wings curving in to meet it. The front entrance featured four sets of double doors with Art Deco glazing, set back from the street by a golden terrazzo floor. The entrance was flanked by four shop units, two on each side, which also featured upon construction matching Art Deco glazing to the cinema itself. The vertical central tower was built largely of reconstituted sandstone with two sets of three narrow window bays on both the first and second floors of the building, and at the top of the tower was a large wooden Broadway sign coloured in red and gold.

The foyer of the Broadway featured a central octagonal ticket booth, a grand staircase to the balcony above, and entrance to the stalls of the auditorium at the rear. The balcony foyer above provided access to the circle of the auditorium, and to a tea room with a fireplace that overlooked Main Street, operated by the Gardiner family. The auditorium of the Broadway originally held 1060 seats, with wide proscenium arches, red curtains, a colour scheme of stone and flame with red, amber, and blue lighting, and six Art Deco ceiling air vents stylised with a camel motif. The projection room was equipped with Ross-London projectors and a Western Electric sound system.

=== 1935–1976 ===
The Broadway officially opened on 29 April 1935. The building was opened by the provost of Prestwick at the time, D.H. Marr, in a ceremony with the first film shown to the public being The Barretts of Wimpole Street. The Broadway operated as a full-time cinema until the early 1960s. Highlights of the building's cinema history include visits from Scottish personality Sir Harry Lauder during World War II on 11 February 1940 for a charity event, and American actress Vivian Blaine on 5 August 1947. The Broadway began to introduce bingo to the programme in the 60s, with the Broadway Bingo and Social Club being formed. Thereafter, bingo and cinema shared the Broadway's schedule until bingo took over full-time in 1966. In 1976, the grandson of the original chairman of the cinema Mr. J.C. Sword, Jon Sword, attempted to bring cinema back; however, this venture was unsuccessful with the last film to show being One Flew Over the Cuckoo's Nest on 20 November 1976.

=== The leisure centre era (1981–2003) ===
After a short period of dereliction, by 1981 the building had been sold and had since re-opened as the newly named Broadway Leisure Centre, subsequently renamed Prestwick Leisure Centre. The leisure centre consisted of an amusement arcade in the former foyer, a small billiard room in the rear stalls, and leisure facilities in the remainder of the auditorium that included three championship-standard squash courts, along with a gym, viewing lounge, and changing facilities. The leisure centre was operated by J.E. Sheeran Amusements Ltd. and upon closing in 2003, the Broadway was sold to hospitality chain Buzzworks Holdings Ltd.

== Future ==
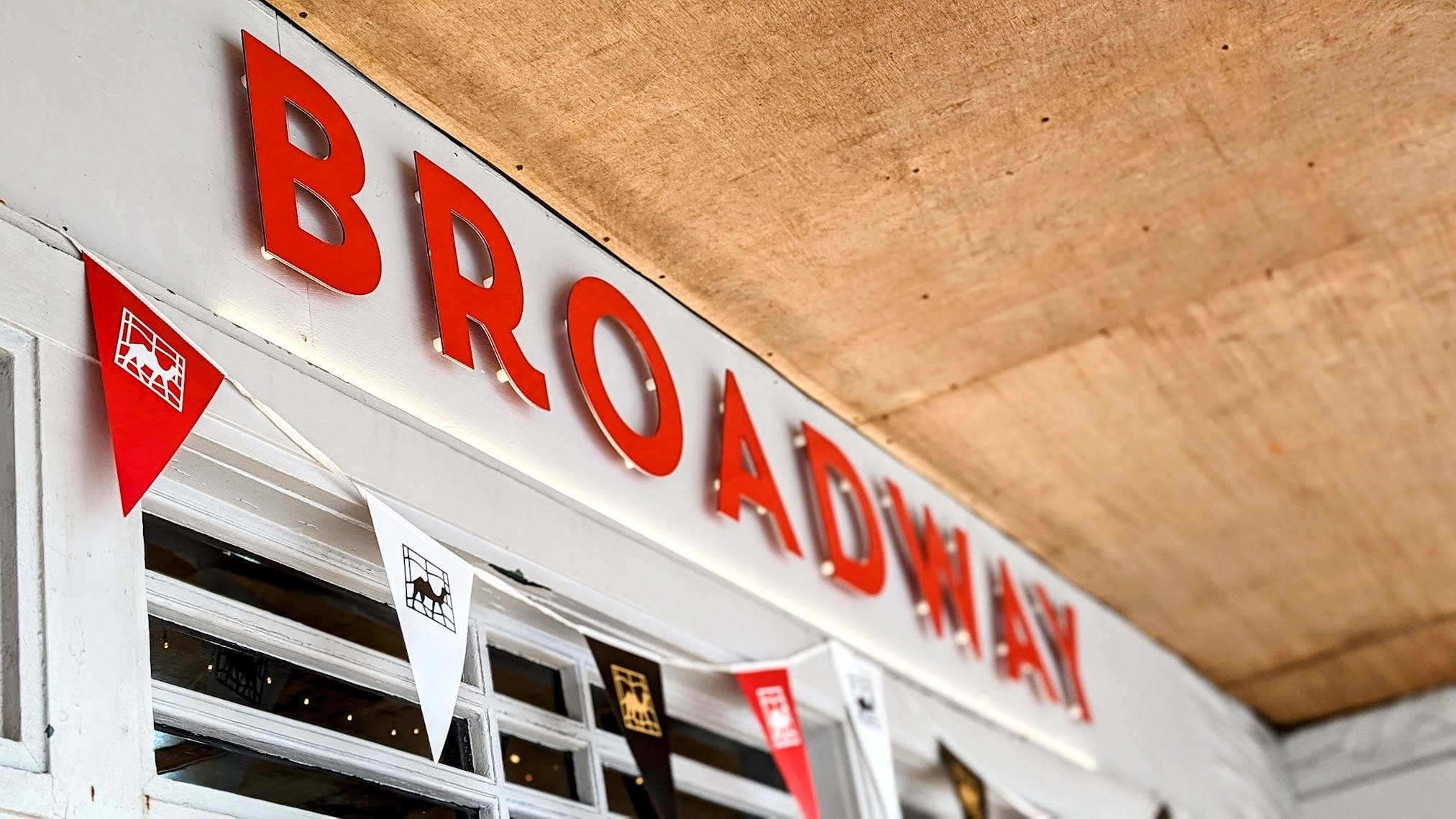
The Broadway Cinema's entrance sign in 2024.

Friends of the Broadway Prestwick is a registered charity founded by local volunteers, with the aim of re-opening the Broadway as an Art Deco cinema, multi-purpose entertainment venue, and inter-generational community hub. The charity first signed a licence to occupy agreement with previous owners Buzzworks Holdings Ltd. in April 2023, and began taking initial steps to slow the rate of decay in the building after 20 years of dereliction. In December 2023, funding was secured from the Scottish Land Fund to purchase the building with an award of £328,060. Then, on the building's 89th anniversary, 29 April 2024, the purchase was finalised as the Broadway was brought into community ownership for the first time.

The charity has appointed Burrell Foley Fischer as the project's chosen architects, with work as of 2025 underway to begin the restoration process and plan for the Broadway's redevelopment. The charity has over 1,600 members, and a board of directors supported by a team of employees, executive advisors, and supporting roles. The project has featured on national television, radio, and news outlets across 2023 and 2024, with appearances on STV News, BBC Radio Scotland, and in newspapers such as The Herald, The Times, and The National.
