= Brenkert =

Brenkert may refer to:

- Wayne Brenkert (1898–1979), American football player
- Brenkert Brenograph Jr., projector
