= Atmospheric theatre =

Type of movie theater

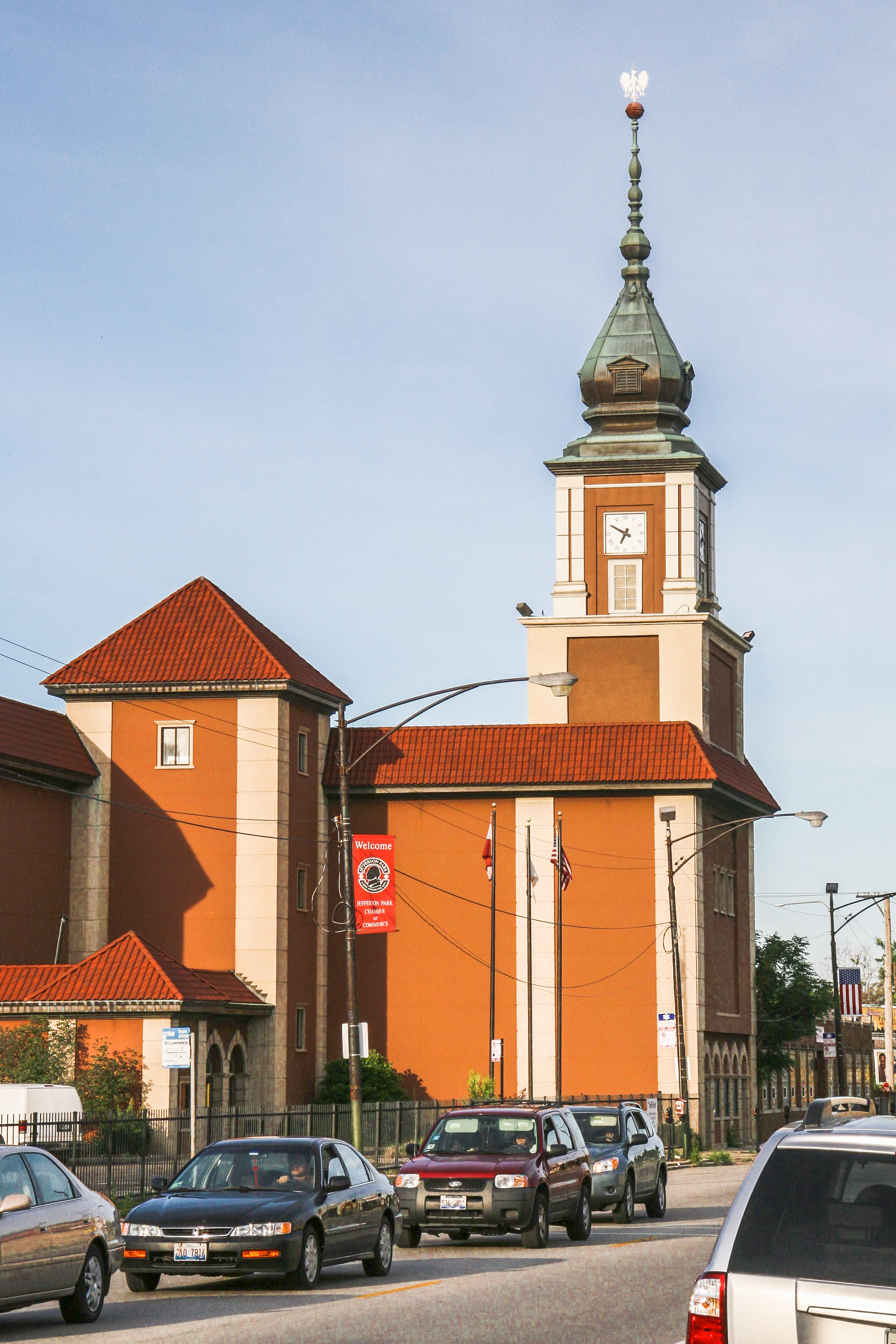
The Gateway Theatre in Jefferson Park, Chicago. The theater's Baroque spire is a replica of one on the Royal Castle in Warsaw.

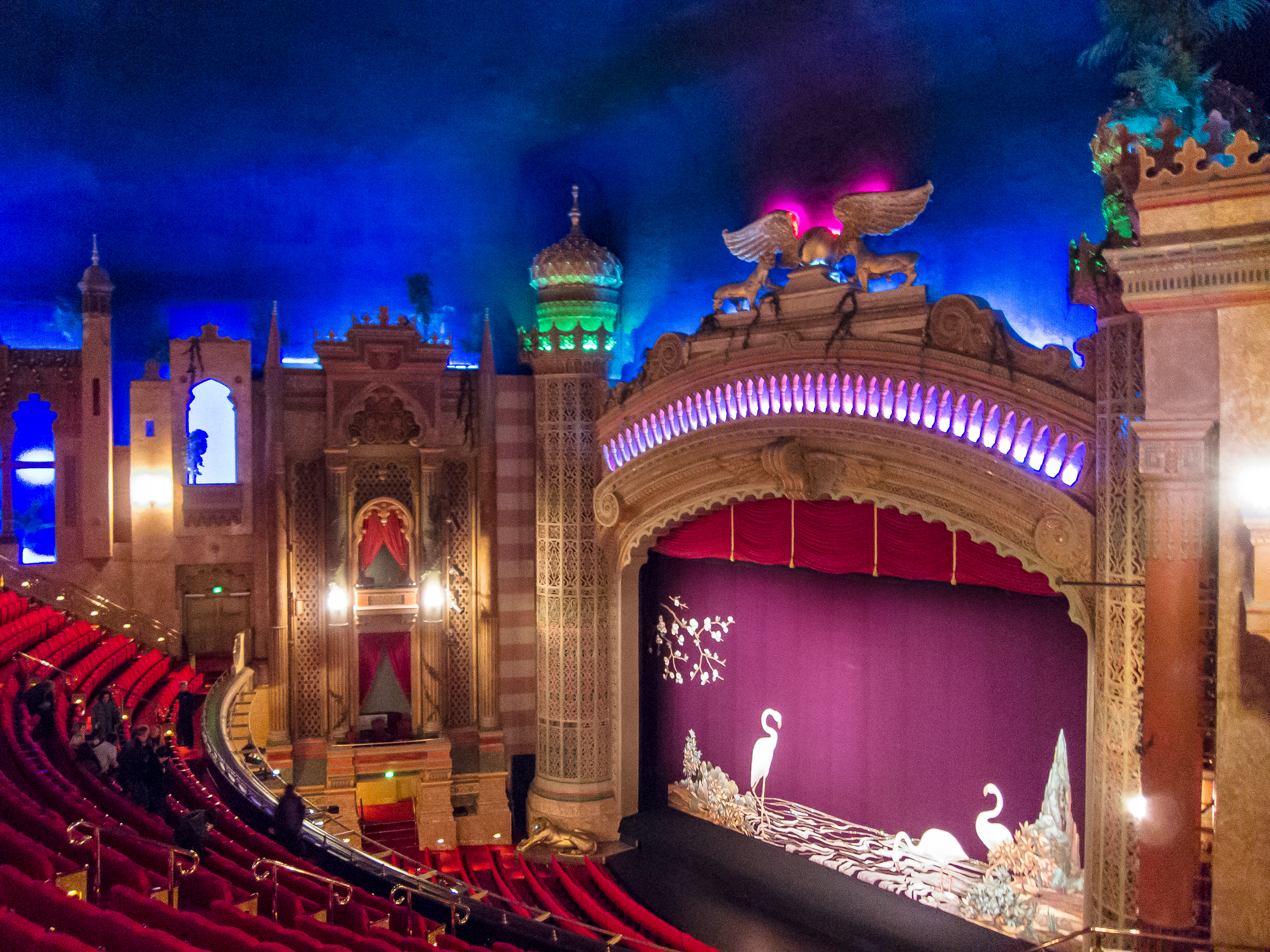
The front of the Auckland Civic Theatre, with its Indian Moghul palace motifs

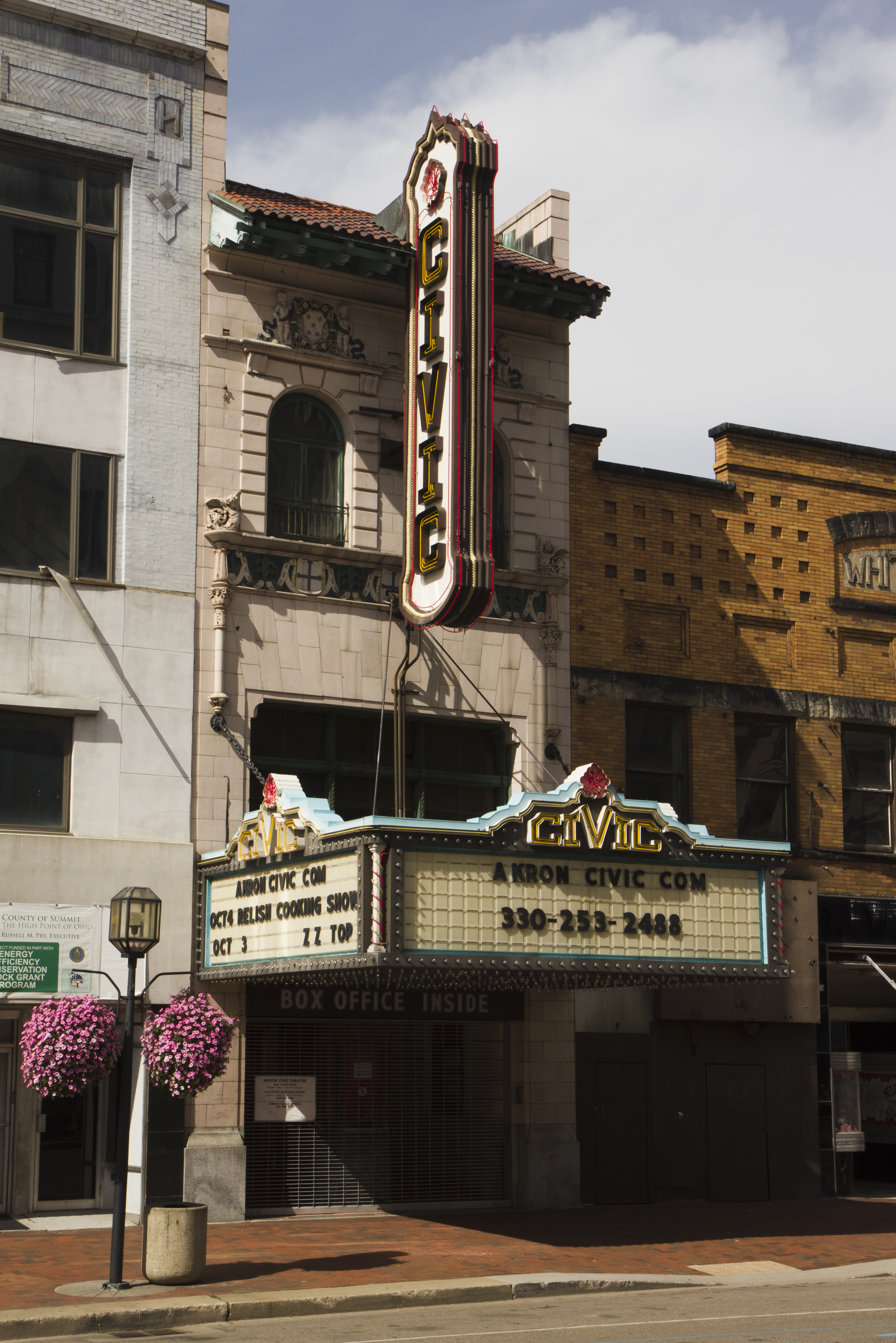
The Akron Civic Theatre's façade and marquee.

An atmospheric theatre is a type of movie palace design which was popular in the late 1920s. Atmospheric theatres were designed and decorated to evoke the feeling of a particular time and place for patrons, through the use of projectors, architectural elements and ornamentation that evoked a sense of being outdoors. This was intended to make the patron a more active participant in the setting.

The most successful promoter of the style was John Eberson. He credited the Hoblitzelle Majestic Theatre (Houston, 1923, since demolished) as the first. Before the end of the 1920s he designed around 100 atmospheric theatres in the U.S. and a few other countries, personally selecting the furnishings and art objects. His most notable surviving theatres in the United States include the Tampa Theatre (1926), Palace Theatre (1928), Majestic Theatre (1929), Paramount Theatre (1929), and the Loew's Theatre (1929). Remaining international examples include The Civic Theatre (1929, Auckland, New Zealand), The Forum (1929, Melbourne, Australia), as well as two theatres completed in Sydney, Australia, the Capitol Theatre (1928) and State Theatre (1929) (both designed by Henry Eli White with assistance from Eberson), and Le Grand Rex, (1932, Paris, France) which was designed by architect Auguste Bluysen with assistance from Eberson.

== Surviving atmospheric theatres in the United States ==
=== Designed by John Eberson ===
John Eberson was the most successful promoter and designer of the atmospheric style. His last atmospheric design in the US was the "Midwest Theatre" at 17 N. Harvey Ave., Oklahoma City, Oklahoma, which opened August 1, 1930, but was demolished in 1976. The following seventeen of his atmospheric theatres in the United States are still in operation.

==== Akron Civic Theatre (Akron, Ohio) ====
The Akron Civic Theatre was built in 1929 by Marcus Loew and designed by theater architect John Eberson. It opened as Loew's Theatre, and later Cinema Theatre and seats 3,000 people. The auditorium is designed to resemble a night in a Moorish garden. Twinkling stars and drifting clouds travel across the domed ceiling. Located on Akron's South Main Street, the theater's entrance lobby extends over the Ohio and Erie Canal. The theater has a small multicolored terra cotta façade dominated by a large marquee. The interior of the entrance and lobby is designed to resemble a Moorish castle with Mediterranean decor, complete with medieval-style carvings, authentic European antiques and Italian alabaster sculptures. A grand full-sized Wurlitzer organ hidden beneath the stage rises to the stage level on a special elevator. In June 2001, the Akron Civic Theatre closed its doors for the most expensive and extensive renovation in its history in order to bring the theater up to modern performance and patron standards, and to restoring its failing 72-year-old infrastructure. The renovation cost just over $19 million, which included additional restroom facilities, new concession stands and expansion of the lobbies. The renovation allowed for the Civic to better serve customers with special needs by adding more handicapped seating and a new elevator. To bring the theatre up to new standards the dressing rooms were all redone and the stage was expanded from twenty-six feet to forty feet. Also added to the Civic was a freight elevator, a new loading dock and a cross-over space behind the stage's back wall. Other improvements included updating the sound system, HVAC, roof exterior, electrical service and modernizing the plumbing. The newly renovated Civic Theatre re-opened in November 2002.

==== Avalon Regal Theater (Chicago, Illinois) ====
The Avalon Regal Theater opened in 1927 as the Avalon Theater, known later as the New Regal Theater, built in a Moorish Revival style. From 1927 to 1937 it was a live performing arts venue, and then a movie venue until first closure in 1967. By this time, more African Americans began to move into the area around the theater, transforming local culture and taking advantage of this historic gem for their musical and artistic ends. It reopened in 1970 as Miracle Temple Church and a meeting place for 15 years. It then closed for renovation, reopening in 1987 as a performing arts venue named the New Regal Theater, in homage to the Regal Theater in Bronzeville, which had been a celebrated cultural center for Chicago's African American community beginning in the 1920s until it caught fire in September 1971. In 2003, the New Regal Theatre closed due to insufficient attendance to cover running costs, but funds were obtained for renovation and it reopened in late 2008. Unfortunately, some of the funds were misapplied to the new owner's personal expenses, and it closed for the fourth time in 2011, due to foreclosure. Kanye West has pledged $1 million, and funding continues, to raise capital to reopen and run the venue, with possibilities including plans "to recreate pivotal moments in entertainment history using holographic stage technology".

==== Capitol Theatre (Flint, Michigan) ====
The Capitol Theatre is a cinema and concert venue. It opened in 1928, designed to look like a Roman garden, was remodelled in 1957, but has had a major restoration to the original ambience but with up-to-date services, completed in 2011.

==== Carpenter Theatre (Richmond, Virginia) ====
The Carpenter Theatre, originally Loew's Theatre and later the Carpenter Theatre Center for the Performing Arts, is the cornerstone of the Dominion Energy Center (previously Richmond CentreStage), which also includes three adjacent modern performance spaces, offices, and elsewhere the Altria Theater (none of which are atmospheric and all of which are by different architects). The Carpenter Theatre was built in 1927/28, giving a Spanish-Moorish ambience. It currently has about 1,800 seats and is said to be fully renovated and restored, but now with state-of-the-art lighting and world-class acoustics. It has "newly installed fiber optic stars twinkling overhead in the repainted midnight sky ceiling, one of the many preserved and enhanced elements of John Eberson's original theater design"

==== Indiana Theatre (Terre Haute, Indiana) ====
The Indiana Theatre has a Spanish courtyard design and was one of the first Eberson theatres to exhibit atmospheric elements. While not fully atmospheric, the Indiana Theatre's original lighting system gave a blue hue to the auditorium ceiling and scattered light to simulate stars. The tile and terrazzo flooring, shapes of windows, prominence of Spanish coats of arms, Churrigueresque exterior, as well as numerous plaster designs that were seen first in the Indiana Theatre became a framework for later designs. Eberson stated, "Into this Indiana Theatre I have put my very best efforts and endeavors in the art of designing a modern theatre such as I have often pictured as what I would do were I given a free hand."

==== Palace (Louisville, Kentucky) (commonly known as the Louisville Palace) ====
The Louisville Palace, with Spanish Baroque architecture, seats 2,700 and opened as Loew's Theatre in 1928, and was later called Loew's United Artist Theatre, and then United Artists Theatre. It closed from 1985 to 1994, and since reopening, refurbished and upgraded to a high standard, has been primarily a concert venue.

==== Majestic Theatre (Dallas, Texas) ====
The Majestic Theatre, constructed in 1920 with Renaissance Revival ambience and, originally, with 2,800 seats, was the first Eberson theatre to use a simulated outdoor sky ceiling. It originally hosted a variety of live acts, adding movies from 1922, before changing to movies only from 1932 until closure in 1973. Passed to the City of Dallas, it was restored inside and out to its original glory, also adding a sprung floor on the stage for dancing, and advanced sound and lighting systems. It then re-opened in 1983, with 1,570 seats, as a Performing Arts Center, hosting musical productions, dramatic plays, national pageants, dance, and concerts.

==== Majestic Theatre (San Antonio, Texas) ====
The Majestic Theatre opened in 1929, with the ambience of a Spanish courtyard, having 4,000 seats in the first fully air-conditioned venue in Texas, for both live and movie performances. After a period of closure, it reopened in 1989, continuing with a mix of live performances, including concerts, and movies, often musicals, but now with only 2,264 larger seats.

==== Olympia Theater (Miami, Florida) ====
The Olympia Theater, previously the Olympia Theater & Office Building and then the Gusman Cultural Center, then Gusman Center for the Performing Arts, then Olympia Theater at the Gusman Center for the Performing Arts, was built in 1925–6 in Moorish Revival style, with 2,170 seats, to replicate a Spanish garden. It originally showed silent movies, and by 1929 also talking pictures and vaudeville then, by the 1950s, many concerts. By the late 1960s, with declining use, the venue was to be demolished, but was bought by a philanthropist, Maurice Gusman who, during a closure from 1970 to 1972, restored the auditorium and reopened it as the home of the Florida Philharmonic Orchestra. In 1975, he gifted the venue to the City of Miami as a rock concert venue. Renovations continued until 1977. In the late 80s, usage declined again, and the Gusman Estate stepped in again to save the building. After renovations from 1989, the building reopened as a performing arts center in 1994, including concerts by international stars, renovations continuing till 1996. There were more renovations 2000-02 and 2009–12, and by then, there were only 1,567 (more comfortable) seats. In 2014, the original "Olympic Theater" name returned. Closures due to COVID-19 were devastating to the small non-profit running the theater, and in 2020 they had to return management and operation to the City of Miami.

==== Orpheum Theatre (Wichita, Kansas) ====
The Orpheum Theatre opened in 1922 with 1,700 seats and the auditorium emulating a Spanish garden, and having an unusually tall proscenium arch. Built as a vaudeville theatre, it was adapted in 1929 to also show movies, and mixed them with live entertainment until closure in 1976. Notably, with the economic boom brought on by 1940s defense spending, the Orpheum was kept open 24 hours a day to accommodate the many shifts of workers building airplanes for WWII. In 1976, the building was stripped of saleable items and abandoned. With most less notable cinemas and theatres also closing and being demolished, enough people rallied behind the Orpheum to prevent that fate, and in 1978, the City declared it a Historic Landmark, followed in 1980 by addition to the National Register of Historic Places. There were legal issues regarding the adjoining premises, and the non-profit formed to own the Orpheum did not receive clear title till 1992, by which time there were significant structural repairs required before normal restoration activities could commence. Safety-critical works continued up to 2022, but as of May 2023, the venue is operating and appears to have a fairly full calendar months in advance.

==== Palace Theatre (Canton, Ohio) ====
The Palace Theatre opened in 1926, a million dollar gift from Harry Ink, a local industrialist, with decoration evoking a Spanish courtyard in the evening or morning. It was intended for vaudeville, other performing arts and (initially silent) movies, and the mix of live performances and movies continues to this day. The theatre did close, due to declining footfall, in 1976, but local people rallied to save it from demolition and make it viable, and it reopened in 1980, with restoration being ongoing since then.

==== Palace Theatre (Marion, Ohio) ====
The Palace Theatre was built in 1928 and renovated in 1976 and 2015. With a Spanish Revival courtyard design, the theatre features low voltage lighting in the ceiling to mimic stars and the original reconditioned cloud machine to simulate moving clouds. Alcoves in the theatre contain stuffed birds, including a macaw that Eberson sometimes included in his interior design work, and most of the original Pietro Caproni statues.

==== Paramount Theatre Centre & Ballroom (Anderson, Indiana) ====
The Paramount Theatre Centre & Ballroom, originally known as the Paramount Theatre, opened in 1929 with 1700 seats, the interior evoking a Spanish village courtyard. Intended for vaudeville (recognised as likely to decrease as no longer fashionable), legitimate theatre and the new talking pictures (expected to increase in popularity) it was only able to show silent movies for the first year, due to long delivery of the sound equipment. Unfortunately, the theatre organ, intended to accompany silent movies, was also not installed till 1930! It continued with a mix of live theatre, concerts and movies until it closed in 1985. A group of local people formed in 1989 to save it from demolition, reopened as soon as possible, and entered a program of renovation which is still ongoing. In particular, it closed for most of 1995 for repairs which were incompatible with the frequent presence of audiences. It now has 1458 wider seats, and runs a mix of live theatre, concerts and movies.

==== Rose Blumkin Performing Arts Center (Omaha, Nebraska) ====
The Rose Blumkin Performing Arts Center opened in 1926 as the Riviera Theater, designed in Hispano-Italian style to evoke the Mediterranean Riviera. In 1929, it was sold and renamed Paramount Theater, but closed in 1957, changing hands several times, and enduring a year as a bowling alley, before it reopened as the Astro Theater, and eventually closing as a movie theater in June 1980. After a number of years of disuse, it was restored and reopened as the Rose Blumkin Performing Arts Center, a live theater venue.

==== State Theatre (Kalamazoo, Michigan) ====
The State Theatre opened in 1927, seating 1,300 people, with the interior reflecting a beautiful Spanish courtyard. The ceiling was painted dark blue with twinkling electric stars, and moving clouds which are projected across it to create an outdoor atmosphere. The auditorium, lobby, and mezzanine are decorated in a Mediterranean color scheme with pottery, furniture, wrought iron, statues, and paintings. Outside they utilized buff-colored tapestry, brick, and ornate terra-cotta accents. Initially it was home to vaudeville shows, dance recitals, and silent films. In 1964, the theatre was modernised. The original 45-foot vertical sign on the corner was deteriorating with age and was replaced with a horizontal marquee over the box-office. The interior was stripped of some of its original decor, for example many statues, but many of the items removed were stored rather than disposed of, and elements such as the "starry sky" ceiling in the auditorium remained. It closed in 1982 due to inadequate profits, but in 1985 was bought by a local property company, which has invested heavily in it, with further renovations and restorations partially undoing the 1964 modernisations. Unusually, it now has more seats (1,590) than it was built with. It is currently the premier live performance venue in Kalamazoo.

==== Tampa Theatre (Tampa, Florida) ====
The Tampa Theatre was built in 1926. Designed by John Eberson, the Tampa is a superior example of the atmospheric style featuring an auditorium that resembles a Mediterranean courtyard under a nighttime sky. Featured on the theater's opening night was the silent film The Ace of Cads starring Adolph Menjou. Closed in 1973, it was rescued and reopened in 1978. It now presents and hosts over 600 events a year including a full schedule of the first run and classic films, concerts, special events, corporate events, tours, and educational programs

==== Uptown Theater (Kansas City, Missouri) ====
The Uptown Theater Italian Renaissance atmospheric theater opened in 1928 and features an outdoor Mediterranean courtyard motif. It was built to seat 2,300, but the current configuration allows for 1,700. In 1931, the Uptown copyrighted a Fragratone system, which funneled fragrances into the auditorium via the ventilation ducts at appropriate moments during films. The Uptown hosted movies as well as live vaudeville and stage productions through the 1970s. By the late 1970s, the theater began to function primarily as a concert venue, and it remained that way until it closed its doors in 1989. During its later years, the interior had fallen into disrepair, and all of the original details were whitewashed. Then, a $15 million renovation of the theater was completed. The original splendor was restored in the details and colors of Eberson's original design. In addition, 33,000 sq ft (3,100 m2) of new lobby, bar, office and banquet space was added. Because of the redevelopment, the Uptown remains one of the few remaining atmospheric theatres still in operation.

=== Designed by other architects ===
Other architects also designed atmospheric theatres. These include the following:

==== 7th Street Theatre (Hoquiam, Washington) ====
The 7th Street Theatre was built in 1928, seats over 950 people, and features an outdoor Spanish garden motif.

==== Arlington Theater (Santa Barbara, California) ====
The Arlington Theater was built in 1931 on the former site of the Arlington Hotel, which was destroyed following the 1925 earthquake. The current structure was erected in 1930 as a showcase movie house for Fox West Coast Theaters. It was restored and expanded in the mid-1970s by Metropolitan Theaters Corporation. It opened in its current incarnation in 1976.

==== Avalon Theatre (Bay View, Wisconsin) ====
The Avalon Theatre near Milwaukee, Wisconsin was designed by architect Russell Barr Williamson, who worked as draftsman and site supervisor for Frank Lloyd Wright before opening his own Wisconsin practice in 1918.

==== Aztec Theatre (San Antonio, Texas) ====
The Aztec Theatre was completed in 1926 and originally seated 2,500, with an auditorium reminiscent of a courtyard in a Mesoamerican temple complex.

==== Coronado Theatre (Rockford, Illinois) ====
The Coronado Theatre was built in 1927 to a design by Frederic J. Klein, at a cost of $1.5 million. The auditorium is designed as a courtyard with Spanish and Italianate facades, painted clouds, and electric 'stars', with Japanese dragons and lanterns decorating the screens of the Barton organ. It was built to present both films and live entertainment, with a fully equipped stage and orchestra pit. Donated to the City of Rockford, it was restored 1998–2001, and primarily features live stage shows and music concerts.

==== Egyptian Theatre (DeKalb, Illinois) ====
The Egyptian Theatre was built in 1929 with an Egyptian Revival design. Designed by architect Elmer F. Behrns, who had an interest in Egyptology. The theatre was saved in 1978 by a non-profit organization who has owned and operated the Theatre ever since. There were once over 100 Egyptian Theatres built around the country, today there are only seven remaining in the United States and this is the only one east of the Rocky Mountains. Listed on the National Register of Historic Places, the Egyptian Theatre in DeKalb, IL was named as one of the top 20 architectural treasures in the State of Illinois by the Illinois Office of Tourism in 2018.

==== Fox Theatre (Atlanta, Georgia) ====
The Fox Theatre was built in 1929, was designed by Ollivier J. Vinour of Marye Alger & Vinour, and is the city's only surviving movie palace. The original architecture and décor can be roughly divided into two architectural styles: Islamic architecture (building exterior, auditorium, Grand Salon, mezzanine Gentlemen's Lounge and lower Ladies Lounge) and Egyptian architecture (Egyptian Ballroom, mezzanine Ladies Lounge and lower Gentlemen's Lounge). The 4,665-seat auditorium replicates an Arabian courtyard complete with a night sky of 96 embedded crystal "stars" (a third of which flicker) and a projection of clouds that slowly drift across the "sky".

==== Fox Theatre (Visalia, California) ====
The Fox Theatre was built 1929–30. It was designed to evoke the garden of a South Asian temple.

==== Gateway Theatre (Chicago, Illinois) ====
The Gateway Theatre was built in Chicago's Jefferson Park neighborhood, the Gateway Theatre is an atmospheric theater designed by architect Mason Rapp of the prestigious firm of Rapp & Rapp in 1930. It was the city's first movie theater built exclusively for the talkies.

==== Keith-Albee Theatre (Huntington, West Virginia) ====
The Keith-Albee Theatre was opened to the public in 1928 as part of the Keith-Albee-Orpheum circuit, the premier vaudeville tour on the East Coast of the United States. Later on in its life, it showed movies and is now a performing arts center with occasional film screenings.

==== Merced Theatre (Merced, California) ====
The Merced Theatre was built in 1931, in a mix of Art Deco and Spanish Colonial Revival style. Its use of dramatic atmospheric features included castle facades and ventilators that sent "clouds" floating across the star-bespeckled ceiling.

==== Music Box Theatre (Chicago, Illinois) ====
The Music Box opened on August 22, 1929. It is still an operational single screen cinema with atmospheric effects.

==== Orpheum Theatre (Phoenix, Arizona) ====
The Orpheum opened in 1929, and was used for vaudeville, movies, and as a touring Broadway theater. After falling into disrepair for some years, the Orpheum Theatre was purchased in 1984 by the city of Phoenix, which then began a 12-year, $14 million restoration. The Conrad Schmitt Studios created the transformation and the Orpheum reopened on January 28, 1997, with a performance of Hello, Dolly! starring Carol Channing. After the performance, Channing, still in costume but out of character, thanked the audience for "not turning this beautiful theatre into a parking lot!"

==== Paradise Center for the Arts (Faribault, Minnesota) ====
The Paradise Center for the Arts was Built in 1929 on the site of the former Faribault Opera House, the Paradise was recently renovated. The motif is one of a Moorish courtyard with Turkish caps over the doors, turrets and 'stonework' walls. Originally built to seat 915, the Paradise has been altered to seat 300.

==== Paramount Theatre (Austin, Minnesota) ====
Paramount Theatre was built in 1929 by Wagner Construction; designed by the firm of Ellerbe & Company, and opened under the Publix banner on September 14, 1929, with a parade. Interior atmospheric design elements depict a quaint Spanish villa under the stars with Spanish Baroque exterior architecture. Now owned and operated by the Austin Area Commission for the Arts, an independent non profit, the theatre presents a full calendar of movies and performing arts.

==== Polk Theatre (Lakeland, Florida) ====
The Polk Theatre was built in 1928 and designed by architect, James E. Casale and was built to simulate a Mediterranean village.

==== The Ramona Theater (Frederick, Oklahoma} ====
The Ramona Theater from 1929 was designed by George Kadane. An excellent example of the Spanish Colonial style that was popular in the Southwest and Florida during the 1920's, the interior includes electronic twinkling stars and brenograph rolling clouds over the midnight blue plaster sky. It is on the National Register of Historic Places.

==== Redford Theatre (Detroit, Michigan) ====
The Redford Theatre was built in 1927 as a silent film theatre and showed its first film in January 1928. At present, it has 1610 seats and has a Japanese tea garden design. The stars in the sky have been upgraded to use fiber optics. The Redford theatre was purchased by the current owner, The Motor City Theatre Organ Society in the mid-1970s and now shows classic films, and hosts occasional stage events including rentals. The theatre has a fully equipped stage with dressing rooms, and when it first opened was also intended to have vaudeville performances. The theatre's mission is to preserve the history of the film arts. Silent films are still occasionally shown and when they are, they are accompanied by the theatre's 1928 Barton Theatre Organ which also has been restored and it is played prior to every film that is shown.

==== Saenger Theatre (New Orleans, Louisiana) ====
The Saenger Theatre was built in 1927 for the Saenger Theatres chain by architect Emile Weil, Its interior evokes a baroque Florentine courtyard. Originally seating approximately 4,000, in 1980 its seating was reduced to approximately 2,736 and it began to function as a performing arts center with occasional film screenings.

== Surviving atmospheric theatres outside of the United States ==
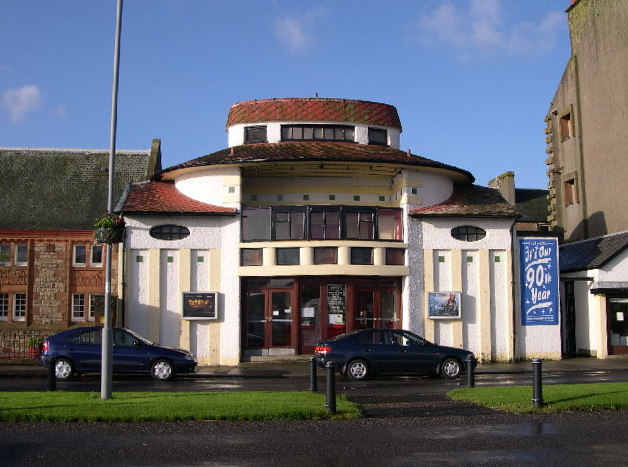
The Campbeltown Picture House is the only extant atmospheric theatre in Scotland.

The following are atmospheric theatres located outside of the United States:

=== Auckland Civic Theatre (Auckland, New Zealand) ===
The Auckland Civic Theatre has the largest intact atmospheric auditorium in Australasia, built in 1929 and featuring an India-inspired motif. Seating 2,750 viewers, in 2000 it was restored to near-original condition. Peter Jackson used the Civic interiors in his remake of the film King Kong.

=== Brixton Academy (London, England, UK) ===
See Rainbow Theatre (London, England, UK), below.

=== Capitol Theatre (Port Hope, Ontario, Canada) ===
The Capitol Theatre is located in Port Hope, Ontario, Canada, and is one of the last three atmospheric movie theatres still in operation in Canada. Constructed in 1930, the interior of the auditorium was designed to resemble a walled medieval courtyard surrounded by a forest. It was also one of the first cinemas in Canada built expressly for talking pictures. It opened on Friday, August 15, 1930, with the film "Queen High" starring Charles Ruggles and Ginger Rogers.

=== Capitol Theatre (Haymarket, New South Wales, Australia) ===
Designed by Henry Eli White with assistance from John Eberson, the Capitol Theatre is located in Haymarket, Sydney, New South Wales, Australia and is the only atmospheric auditorium to survive completely intact in Australia.

=== Cineteca Alameda (San Luis Potosí (city), Mexico) ===
Located in the city center, the Cineteca Alameda was opened on 27 February 1941 with Marlene Dietrich in "Seven Sinners". Seating was originally provided for over 1,000 in orchestra and balcony levels. In recent years it was used for concerts, film festivals and for screening classic movies, it seems to have closed in 2012, but had reopened by 2014 offering a mix of art house movies and live performances. It seems only the orchestra seating area is currently being used.

=== Columbia Theatre (New Westminster, British Columbia, Canada) ===
The Columbia Theatre is the oldest surviving atmospheric cinema in British Columbia, built in 1927 and featuring Moorish design lattice work, with Spanish garden murals and wrought ironwork. Originally built with over 900 seats, the theatre was divided into two levels and was most recently renovated as cabaret-style theatre. Lafflines Comedy Club and Amicus Performing Arts Club operate this heritage theatre.

=== The Forum (Melbourne, Victoria, Australia) ===
The Forum, originally named The State, was twinned between 1962–63 and survives as a live concert venue and cinema. When it opened in February 1929, the cinema had the largest seating capacity in Australia, holding 3,371 people. It was listed on the Victorian Heritage Register in 1978 and classified by the National Trust of Australia in 1994.

=== Le Grand Rex (Paris, France) ===
Le Grand Rex is the largest cinema, theater and music venue in Paris, with 2,800 seats. Opened in 1932, the cinema features a starred "sky" overhead, as well as interior fountains, and resembles a Mediterranean courtyard at night. The cinema features one of the largest screens in Europe. Atmospheric theatre pioneer John Eberson assisted architect Auguste Bluysen with the project.

=== Lido Theatre (The Pas, Manitoba, Canada) ===
The Lido Theatre was built in 1929 and designed by Max Blankstein. The Lido was the world's longest continuously operating atmospheric theatre (87 years straight as of 2016). The interior features an outdoor Mediterranean courtyard motif. It was built to seat 600 people but the current configuration allows for 350. The Lido has avoided major renovations, remaining close to its original design. A rare survivor in its class, one of the few cinemas to stay in the same family for four generations, it remains owned by the Rivalin family. The Lido closed, was vacant for a time, and subsequently was destroyed by fire.

=== Mayfair Theatre (Ottawa, Ontario, Canada) ===
The Mayfair Theatre is a surviving atmospheric cinema of the Spanish Revival form, the second theatre house of this kind to be constructed in Ottawa. Interior features include four faux-balconies, two of which feature clay-tile canopies. Other significant features include stained-glass windows, a proscenium arch, a painted ceiling, decorative plastering and wrought ironwork. The Mayfair has retained the theatre clock used since its inception, a unit which features blue illuminated numbering.

=== Palacio Chino (Mexico City, Mexico) ===
The fancy Palacio Chino opened on March 29, 1940. It used the shell of a former ball court, whose space was sufficient for a big movie theatre. It was the only one ever built in Mexico in Chinese style, but unlike the Grauman's Chinese, the interior was of the atmospheric type. In 1945 it was listed as having 4,000 seats in two levels, orchestra and balcony. It featured a fairly big stage, large enough to hold a symphony orchestra, and indeed was sometimes used as a music theater. Celibidache once directed the National Symphony Orchestra here, as an alternate theater to Bellas Artes, itself the home theater of said orchestra. The inevitable comparison with Grauman's Chinese stands only as original inspiration goes, because both buildings are very different. The Palacio Chino has a big, traditional flat facade, right in front of Iturbide street. The many windows of this facade are adorned as small pagodas, and there is a big, ornate marquee. The vestibule was spacious and full of Chinese decorations; even the ticket booths were rendered as pagodas. The auditorium was of the atmospheric type, with pagodas, temples and gold Buddha statues amid gardens. The ceiling was vault-like, not flat but very arched, and of course was painted deep blue. The screen was protected by a heavy black curtain, with Chinese motifs painted upon. The screen arch was very heavily decorated, with dragons appearing here and there.

=== Picture House (Campbeltown, Scotland, UK) ===
The Picture House, locally known as The Wee Pictures, is one of the first purpose-built cinemas in Scotland, and the oldest never used for another purpose. Designed by the Scottish architect Albert Gardner, it opened in May 1913. It was renovated in 1935 in the atmospheric style by the same architect, and restored in 2016–17, with a small additional screen and a new foyer. It is the only surviving atmospheric theatre in Scotland.

=== Rainbow Theatre (London, England, UK) ===
Four Astoria atmospheric theatres (but not the original 1927 Astoria, in the same ownership but as a more conventional theatre) were opened in London by Arthur Segal in 1930, of which three are still standing, though none in quite its original use. The Old Kent Road Astoria has been demolished. The Streatham Astoria is now an 8-screen Odeon multiplex. The Brixton Astoria is now the Brixton Academy music venue, with many original features remaining. And the Finsbury Park Astoria, soon becoming the Paramount Astoria, then briefly in 1970 the Finsbury Park Odeon, and since 1971 the Rainbow Theatre famous as a music venue, is now a church, the UK headquarters of the Universal Church of the Kingdom of God. The auditorium originally seated 4,000 (the largest in the UK), then 3,000 as a music venue, and now somewhat less, but still larger than any current UK cinema. The outside is near-original, and the inside is "jaw-dropping" according to the Guardian, which reported in 2004 the chairman of the Cinema Theatre Association saying the building's restoration had been "astonishingly" good, leaving it as "one of the greatest cinemas of its kind in Europe". The church is said to be tolerant of people asking to look round the building, and the CTA organises occasional public film showings in cooperation with the church. Both the Rainbow Theatre and the Brixton Academy are listed Grade 2*.

=== Rialto Cinema (Dunedin, Otago, New Zealand) ===
The Rialto Cinema originally seated 2,000. The cinema has been converted into a six-theater multiplex. Renovations in 1998 restored its Moorish-themed features and night sky.

=== Roxy Theatre (Saskatoon, Saskatchewan, Canada) ===
The Roxy Theatre was built during the onset of the Great Depression. The interior is decorated in a Spanish Villa style with the walls covered with small balconies, windows and towers that gave the impression of a quaint Spanish village. The ceiling is painted in an atmospheric-style (dark blue and has twinkling lights set in the plaster) to give the impression of the night sky. The Roxy is the last remaining Max Blankstein atmospheric theatre, and is operated by Magic Lantern Theatres.

=== Streatham Odeon (London, England, UK) ===
See Rainbow Theatre (London, England, UK), above.

=== Cine Teatro Opera (Buenos Aires, Argentina) ===
The Cine Teatro Ópera in Buenos Aires, with a capacity for 2,500 people.
