= Campbeltown Picture House =

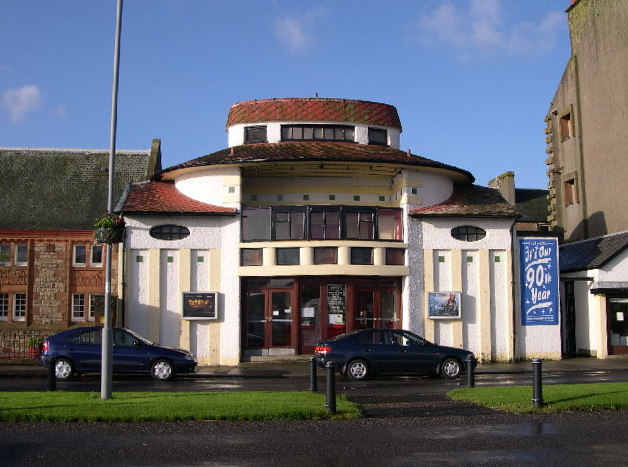

General information
- Type: cinema
- Architectural style: Glasgow style (art nouveau)
- Location: Campbeltown, Argyll, Scotland
- Coordinates: 55°25′26″N 5°36′11″W
- Completed: 1913
- Opened: May 1913
- Renovated: 2016-2017
- Owner: Campbeltown Community Business Ltd

Design and construction
- Architect: Albert V. Gardner

Renovating team
- Architect: Burrell Foley Fischer LLP
- Renovating firm: Corramore Construction
- Structural engineer: David Narro Associates
- Services engineer: Irons Foulner Consulting Engineers Ltd

Website
- http://www.campbeltownpicturehouse.co.uk/

The Campbeltown Picture House is a theatre located in Campbeltown, Scotland. Opened in 1913, it was one of the first purpose-built cinemas in Scotland. It is the only remaining example of an Atmospheric theatre in Scotland.

== History ==
The Picture House, known locally as The Wee Pictures, was designed by the architect Albert Gardner, a student of architecture at Glasgow School of Art from 1901 to 1905. It opened in May 1913, and aside from a short hiatus in the 1980s, has been used continuously as a cinema since. The building is three storeys high with the projection room on the top floor, the balcony on the middle floor and the entrance on the ground floor. Gardiner was asked to refurbish the cinema in 1935, and did so in the "atmospheric style". This included a blue sky with moving white clouds, and the inclusion of small plasterwork buildings to recall a Mediterranean courtyard. Sound equipment was also installed in the cinema as part of the refurbishment.

In August 2017 the Picture House, was voted as one of Scotland's six 'Hidden Gems' as part of Dig It! 2017 campaign.

In November 2017, the National Library of Scotland announced that Campbeltown Community Business Ltd were donating the historical archive relating to the Picture House to the Library's Moving Image Archive. The archive includes newspaper cuttings, architectural drawings, advertisements, financial ledgers, and details of a 1938 plane crash which resulted in the cinema closing the night because the reels for that night's film were on the plane.

== Restoration ==
In 2016, a £2.5 million restoration was undertaken, with work completed in 2017. The work was carried out by architects Burrell Foley Fischer and Corramore Construction, with funding from various sources including the Heritage Lottery Fund, the Scottish Government and Highlands and Islands Enterprise. As a result of the restoration there are now two auditoriums, one with 192 seats, the other with 53 seats. There is a new foyer, café, gallery and education space. The first pictures of the newly refurbished cinema were released in November 2017.
