= Akron Civic Theatre =

Theater and movie theater in Akron, Ohio

Coordinates: 41°4′41″N 81°31′13″W

- The Jewel on Main Street
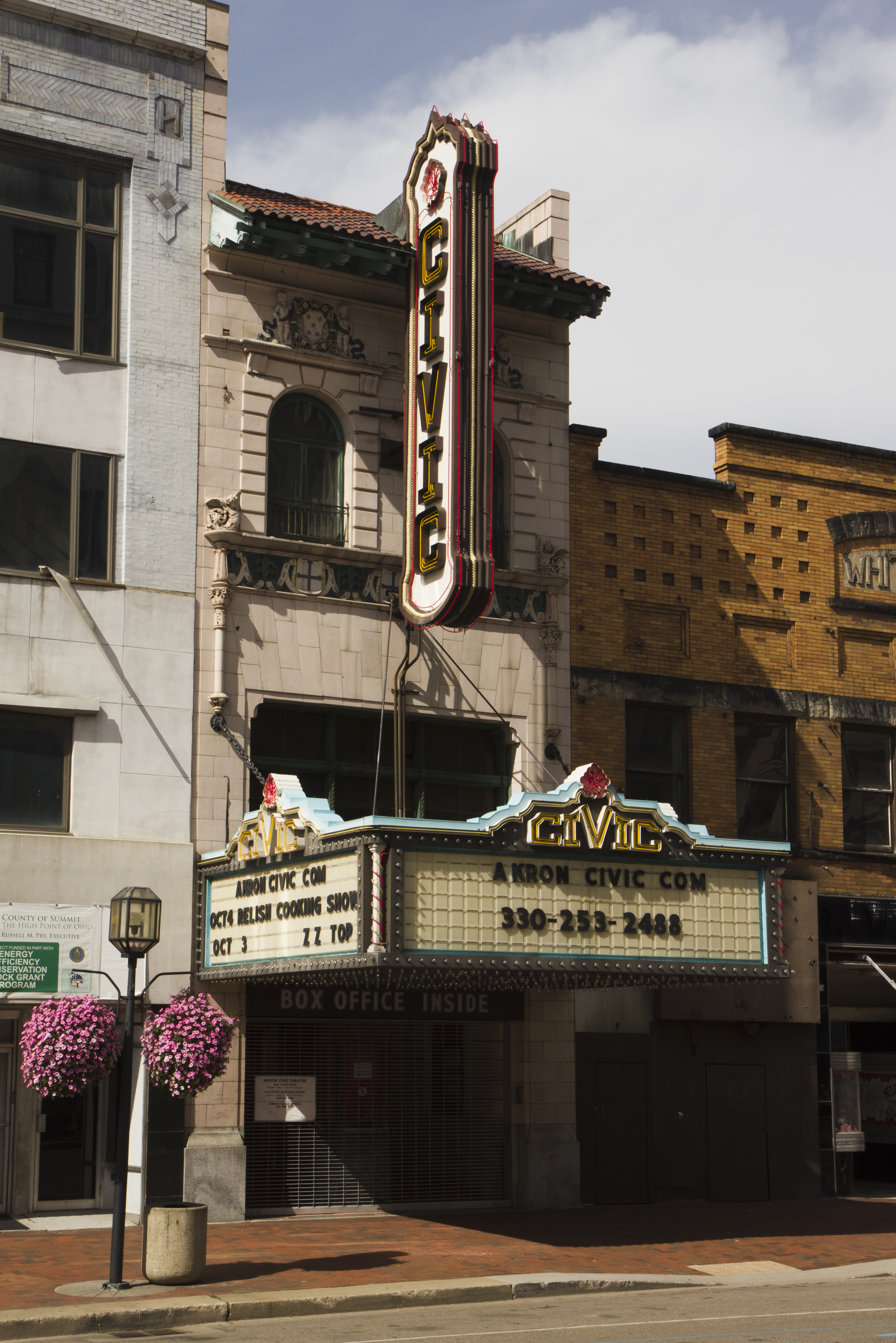
- Exterior view of venue (c.2012)
- Interactive map of Akron Civic Theatre
- Former names: Loew's Theatre (1929-64); Cinema Theatre (1964-66)
- Address: 182 S Main St; Akron, OH 44308-1316
- Location: Downtown Akron
- Capacity: 3,000

Construction
- Opened: April 20, 1929; 97 years ago
- Renovated: 2001-02

Website
- Venue Website
- Akron Civic Theatre
- U.S. National Register of Historic Places
- Area: less than one acre
- Architectural style: Mediterranean, Italian Renaissance
- NRHP reference No.: 73001537
- Added to NRHP: July 16, 1973

The Akron Civic Theatre (originally the Loew's Theatre) is a theater in Akron, Ohio that opened in 1929. It is one of only five remaining atmospheric theatres designed by John Eberson in the United States and is an excellent example of the great movie palaces of the 1920s. The Akron Civic Theatre is the last remaining theater of 11 opened by Marcus Loew, founder of the Loew's theater chain. The Civic is located on South Main Street in Akron and can seat 3,000 people. The theater has been exhibiting shows and special events for 97 years.

== History ==
The theater began as a planned project to be known as "The Hippodrome," commissioned by Akron dance hall owner L. Oscar Beck. Beck envisioned a 3,000-seat theater with thirty stores and restaurants lining its arcade. He began construction on the Hippodrome's lobby in 1919, but by 1921, the project was bankrupt. The lobby stood alone, with its theater end boarded-up, for a decade. In 1925 Marcus Loew visited Akron and chose the Hippodrome Theatre site for the creation of a new theater. He purchased the abandoned lobby and nearby land at a Sheriff's auction for $143,000.

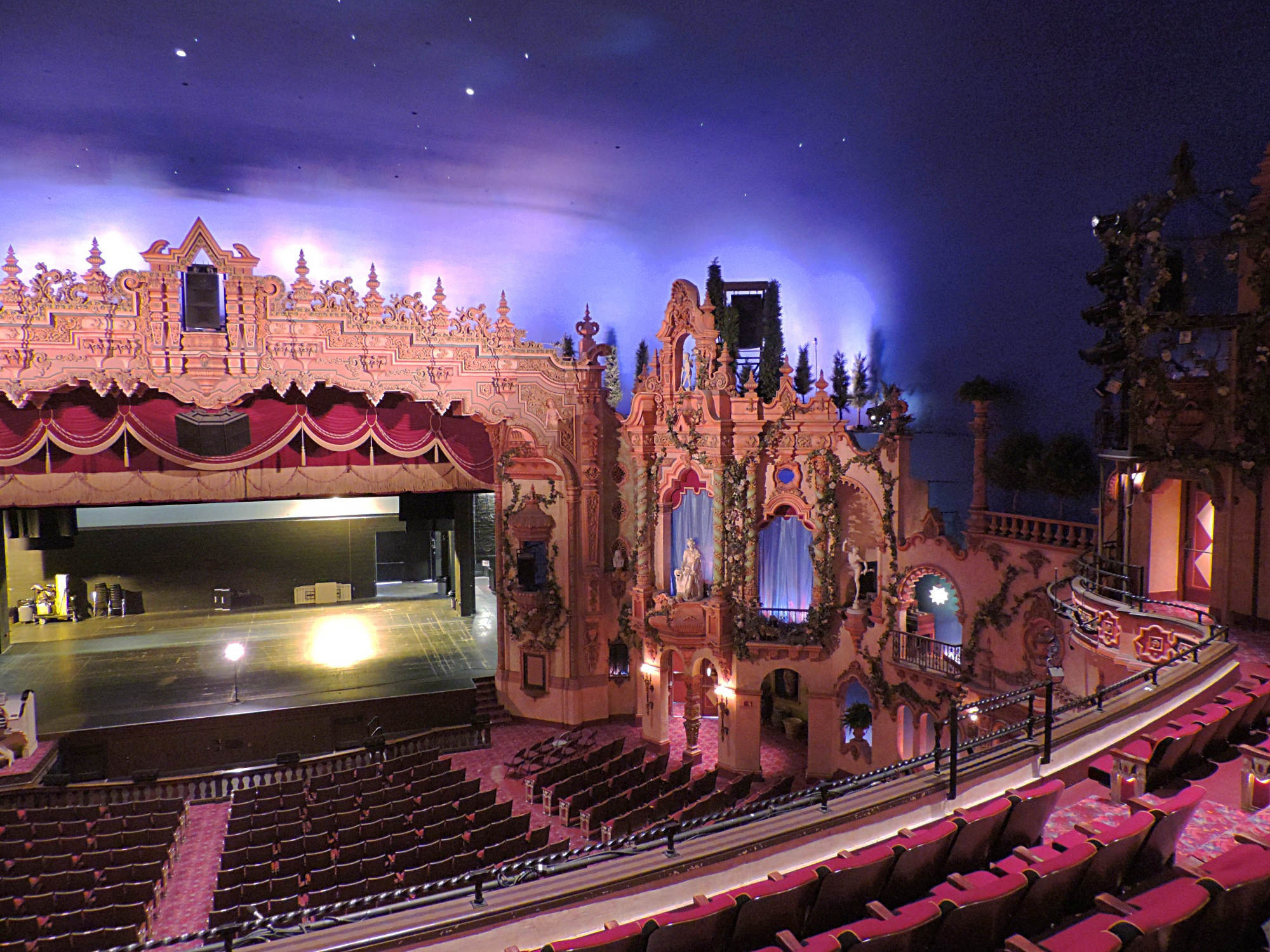
View from balcony

The theater was designed by the famous theater architect John Eberson. The auditorium of Akron's Loew's Theatre was designed to resemble a night in an open-air Moorish garden. Twinkling stars and drifting clouds travel across the domed ceiling. Located on Akron's Main Street, the theater's entrance lobby extends over the Ohio and Erie Canal. The theater has a small multi-colored terra cotta façade dominated by a large marquee. The interior of the entrance and lobby is designed to resemble a Moorish castle with Mediterranean decor, complete with medieval style carvings, authentic European antiques, and Italian alabaster sculptures. A grand full-sized Wurlitzer Theatre organ hidden beneath the stage rises to the stage level on a special lift.

Many significant events have occurred over the years for the Civic. In 1964 the Kelly Operating Company leased the theater, only to be bought out soon after by the Akron Jaycees. The Women's Guild purchased and brought live theater back. In 1984 the Civic had a lien placed on them by the IRS because they were $650,000 in debt. The following year Clarence Randall, retired CEO of M. O'Neil Co., was brought in to eliminate the debt. After the renovation in 2002, the Civic celebrated its reopening with comedian Tim Conway. Then in 2004 the Civic celebrated its 75th anniversary.

Akron's Devo played there in 1979, The Pretenders (with Akron's Chrissie Hynde) played there in 2000, The Black Keys played there in 2007, and Warrant (with members from Akron) played there in 2017.

=== Renovation ===
In June 2001, the Akron Civic Theatre closed its doors for the most expensive and extensive renovation in its seventy-two year history. The renovation cost just over $19 million, which included additional restroom facilities, new concession stands, and expansion of the lobbies. The renovation allowed for the Civic to better serve customers with special needs by adding more handicapped seating and a new elevator. To bring the theatre up to new standards, the dressing rooms were all redone, and the stage was expanded from twenty-six feet to forty feet. Also added to the Civic was a freight elevator, a new loading dock, and a cross-over space behind the stage's back wall.

Other improvements included updating the sound system, HVAC, roof exterior, electrical service, and modernizing the plumbing.

Following its re-opening in November 2002, the new Civic, along with its partner The University of Akron's E. J. Thomas Hall, continued to play a significant leadership role in downtown revitalization. In May 2003, the Civic began a partnership with the City of Akron to program and operate Lock 3 Live!, a new outdoor performance venue featuring more than 80 events and attractions scheduled between Memorial Day and Labor Day.

=== The Women's Guild ===
Formed in 1966, members of the Women's Guild have participated as ushers, performed chores, sold concessions, sponsored fundraisers, and managed boutiques. In 1965, the Civic was being threatened to be turned into a parking lot, when the Akron Jaycees launched a fund-raiser and bought the Akron Civic for $60,000. Following this purchase, Marjorie Schmidt held a meeting at her house to create an organized structure to help keep the Civic in order. Once the Guild officially began, over 180 women became a part of it. Wives of politicians, attorneys, business executives and doctors were a part of the roster. One popular name was Ruth Oenslager, the widow of George Oenslager, a chemist for B.F. Goodrich. She pitched in $22,000 to help save the Civic from becoming a parking lot.

For advertising, the women wrote to celebrities, wanting them to come perform at their theater. The women were able to sponsor Helen Hayes, who subsequently was the "First Lady of American Theater". The event provided the Civic with $6,500, allowing for the payment for the mortgage. New shows were able to be put on display at the theater, including Fiddler on the Roof, Mame, Cactus Flower, The Apple Tree and Man of La Mancha. Other celebrities who have performed at the Civic include Mickey Rooney, Barbara Eden, Louis Armstrong, Vincent Price, Robert Goulet, Loni Anderson and Tony Randall.

Perhaps the largest moneymaker of all was the investment the women made in 1975: a concession stand behind the grand lobby. These investments provided the customers with popcorn, candy, pop, and other refreshments, which in turn helped bolster the income for the theater. Through the years, the Women's Guild has donated over $200,000 and held fundraisers which have helped pay for items such as stage curtains and a new movie screen.
