= Lido Theatre (Canada) =

- Interactive map of Lido Theatre
- Address: 222 Edwards Ave, The Pas, Manitoba
- Coordinates: 53.8245°N 101.2524°W
- Owner: August Rivalin
- Type: atmospheric theatre

Construction
- Opened: {{unbulleted list|1930; 96 years ago
- Building details

General information
- Architectural style: Art Deco
- Construction started: 1928

Design and construction
- Architect: Max Zev Blankstein

The Lido Theatre is an atmospheric theatre in The Pas, Manitoba.

Opening in 1930, it had remained in operation in its near original form since its inception, making it one of Canada's oldest and most unique atmospheric theaters. It was also the first theatre in western Canada designed specifically for movies with sound.

== History ==
=== Early history ===
The Lido Theatre was built in The Pas by contractor John George Hartmier for Auguste "Irish" Rivalin and The Northern Theatre Co. Ltd., a company that Rivalin and his wife Louisa formed a year prior.

The Lido was designed by architect Max Zev Blankstein, who designed several theatres in Winnipeg including the Uptown Theatre (later Academy Bowling Lanes).

It opened in early 1930 as the first theatre in western Canada designed specifically for movies with sound. Primarily designed as a movie theatre, the auditorium was secondarily designed to accommodate the travelling stage performances of the era and was occasionally used to host live productions.

It had remained in operation in its near original form since its inception, making it one of Canada's oldest and most unique atmospheric theaters. According to the Lido's website, the only modern auditorium fixtures were the surround-sound speakers.

The storied property opened to the public in early 1930.

Shortly after opening, the Great Depression began to take hold. After more loans from Irish and Louisa to keep the doors open. However, since Irish could not justify loaning the operation any more money, the partners of Northern Theatre Co. had the choice of either closing the theatre down or selling their portions of the company. They decided to keep it open and to sell their portions to Irish, the majority investor and largest creditor.

In the 1940s, Irish's son Paul Rivalin—after his service in the Air Force of World War II—began operating the Lido with the support of his wife Margaret. The couple would formally purchase the Lido from Irish and Louisa through an agreement executed in 1952.

In the mid-1960s, the lobby was renovated by the engineering department of the T. Eaton Company out of Toronto in order to permanently incorporate a concession area for selling treats. (The renovation would remove two rental units on either side of the lobby.

=== 1970s-1990s ===
In the early 1970s, Paul and Margaret's son August "Gus" Rivalin was made the manager of the theatre, managing the business as a partner before purchasing the business from his parents in 1974. During this time, Gus upgraded to the newest automated 35mm projection equipment.

In 1983, Gus began a home video rental business, called "The Lido Video", in the theatre's lobby. To expand The Lido Video, Gus purchased the building next door, which was once the Bank of Toronto and later the Dominion Bank of Canada. The Lido Video business was expanded into 3 locations over the next 17 years.

In 1997, Gus' video store business opened the largest video store in Manitoba outside of Winnipeg: Saturn Video in Flin Flon.

=== 2000s-2020s ===
Gus’ son August III purchased the properties and businesses from his father in late 2003. From 2003 to 2019, the Lido upgraded to state-of-the-art digital sound and projection equipment.

In early 2020, The Lido went under renovations, but due to the COVID-19 pandemic, the theatre has been closed since. In 2023, The Lido was at risk of closing for good.

The theatre was destroyed by fire on Monday, April 8, 2024.

The Lido Fire

In the early morning hours of April 8th, 2024 emergency services were alerted to a fire within the Lido. Crews attended and made little progress extinguishing the fire, concentrating their efforts on mitigating neighbouring damage. The fire was initially deemed suspicious. However, later investigations showed no presence of an accelerant nor evidence of the source of the fire. Further investigation uncovered negligence on behalf of the buildings owner, the Town of The Pas. In attempting to secure the property in December 2023 the Town of The Pas failed to secure a back gate and a side access point. The Town of The Pas also disabled the water at the curb stop and therefore disabled the entire building and lot's drainage likely flooding all 5 basements. It is most probable that the flooding of all the basements caused chemicals to mix and/or electrical components to short resulting in the fire.
