= Orpheum Theatre (Kansas) =

Theater in Wichita, Kansas, U.S.

- U.S. National Register of Historic Places
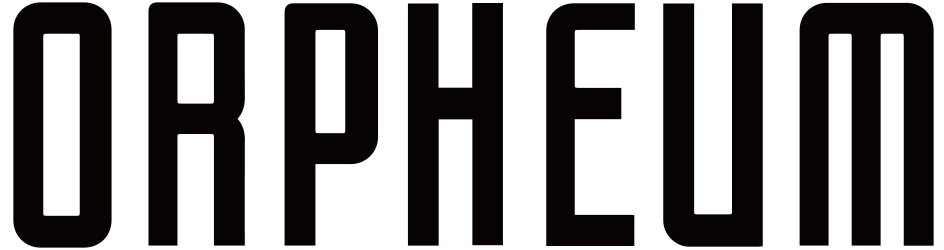
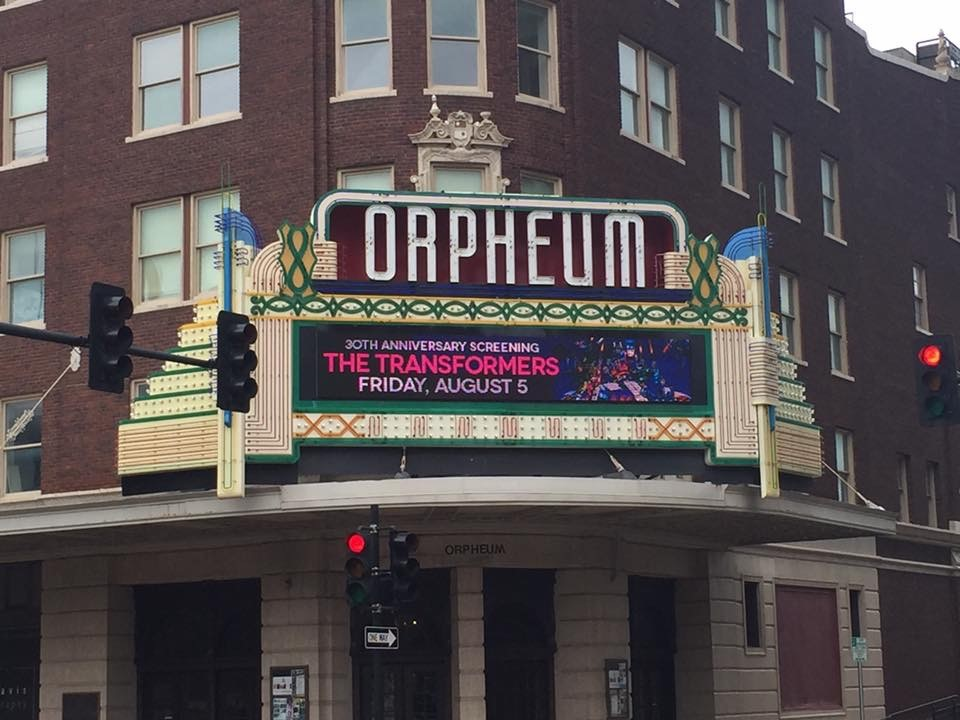

- Location within Kansas Location within the United States
- Location: 200 N. Broadway St., Wichita, Kansas, U.S.
- Coordinates: 37°41′17.16″N 97°20′07.16″W
- Built: 1922
- Architect: John Eberson
- Architectural style: Late 19th and 20th century Revivals, Atmospheric
- NRHP reference No.: 80001473
- Added to NRHP: November 28, 1980

The Orpheum Theatre is a historic theater in downtown Wichita, Kansas, United States. It was designed by renowned theatre architect John Eberson with funding from a group of local investors and opened on September 4, 1922.

== History ==
Originally built as a vaudeville venue, the theatre underwent conversion into a movie house in 1929 and for decades it presented both movies and live entertainment. Throughout the 1920s, the Chicago-based Orpheum circuit brought famous names like: Al Jolson, Fannie Brice, Jack Benny, George Burns, Louis Armstrong, Ella Fitzgerald, Gracie Allen, Gypsy Rose Lee, Bing Crosby, Mickey Rooney, and Harry Houdini to Wichita's Orpheum Theatre. Admission to these shows would generally cost between $0.40 and $0.75. In addition to these live acts, the Orpheum was one of the first theatres to show D.W. Griffith's The Birth of a Nation and hosted the Kansas premier of Gone with the Wind in 1940.

With the economic boom brought on by 1940s defense spending, the Orpheum was kept open 24 hours a day to accommodate the many shifts of workers building airplanes for WWII effort.

=== Closing and Rebirth ===
In the late 1960s and early 1970s, the advent of multiplex movie theatres caused attendance at the Orpheum to drop significantly. Orpheum management tried to keep the venue open with martial arts films and even a brief foray into adult films. These efforts failed and the theatre closed its doors in November 1976. The final film shown was a martial arts film titled The Bodyguard. After stripping the building of its material value, including the seats, the theatre was abandoned and left to rot.

After many nearby downtown theatres were closed and demolished in the 1950s to 1970s, there was a growing effort to save the historic Orpheum Theatre. In order to keep the city of Wichita from demolishing the Orpheum, two local businesswomen, Meredith "Millie" Hill and Marge Setter, created a group called "Save the Orpheum". Their efforts, along with local attorney Stan Wisdom, saved the building from the wrecking ball, virtually at the last minute. Advocacy from other concerned citizens continued and the City of Wichita designated the Orpheum Theatre as an historic landmark in 1978. In 1980, the building was added to the National Register of Historic Places. A nonprofit 501(c)(3) organization called the Orpheum Performing Arts Centre LTD was then formed to take ownership of the theatre. Various legal entanglements complicated ownership of the office complex adjacent to the theatre, until a US District Judge signed an order dismissing the nonprofit group from the lawsuits. In 1992 clear title and ownership of the theatre was formally handed to the nonprofit. However, much work needed to be done in order to restore it to an operational condition.

=== Restoration ===
Before restoration could begin, the building had to be completely cleaned, as it was made uninhabitable by teeming refuse left over from years of abandonment. The roof leaked and needed to be repaired, several walls needed to be re-stabilized, much of the interior paint had peeled, plaster had fallen out of the roof and walls, and much of the exterior brick needed to be replaced. Because the seating had been removed and sold during the closing, the Orpheum board installed used seating taken from various sources throughout Wichita, including a former theatre at Towne East Mall and an auditorium at City Hall. After these basic renovations had taken place, attention was turned to upgrading the theatre's interior functions. An updated heating and air conditioning system was installed in 2001, a new marquee and updated restrooms were added in 2002, the lobby concession area was restored in 2005, the lobby vestibule restored in 2007, exterior brick and roof repair completed in 2010, new LED lights acquired and installed in 2010, exit corridors and doors were repaired and a new handicap ramp was installed in 2012, the projection booth was restored in 2013, and most recently, the auditorium foyer and east stair tower were restored in 2015. Areas still to be addressed are new auditorium flooring, seating, decorative plaster work, and significant stage upgrades.

=== Today ===
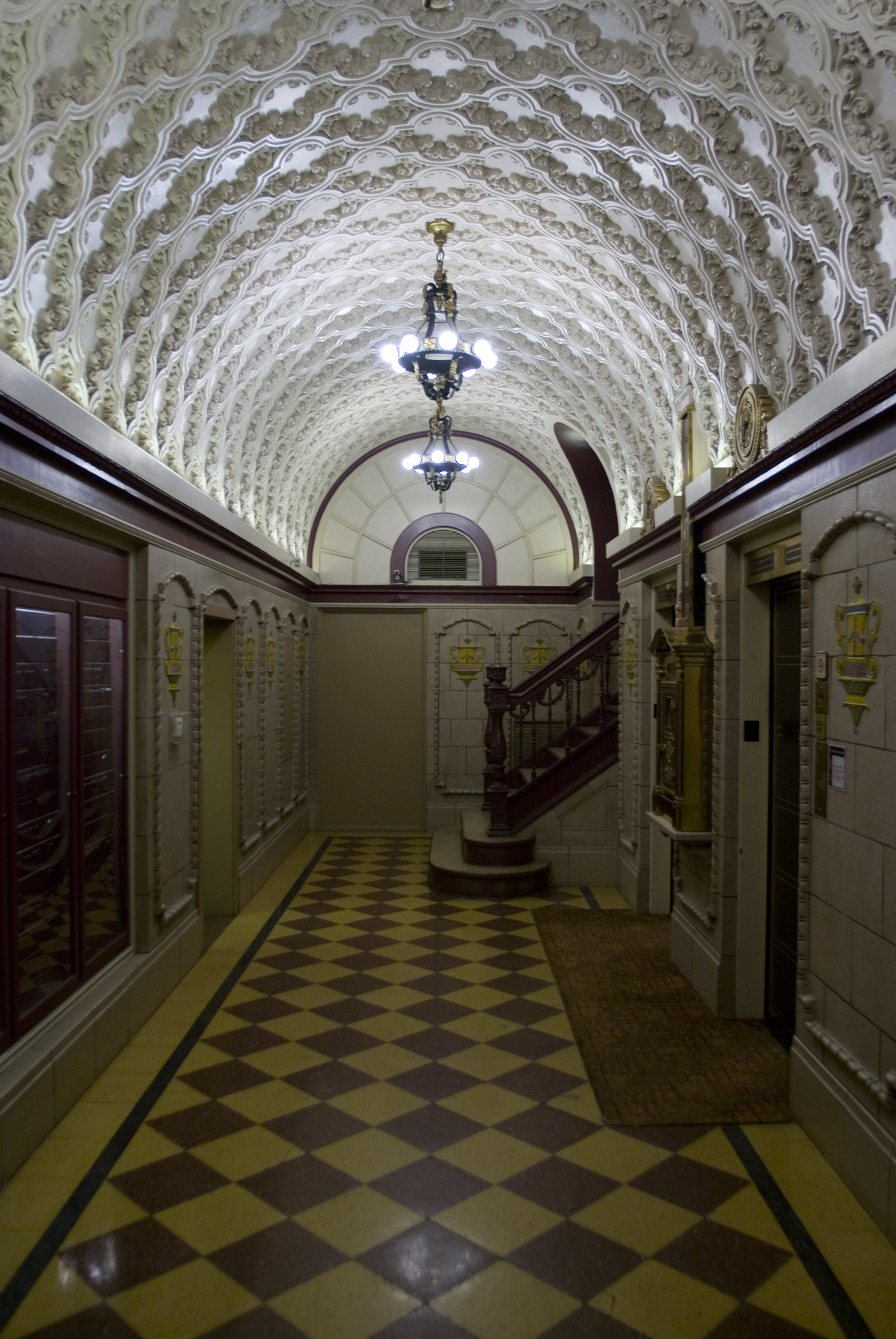
Orpheum Theatre center lobby (2009)

Wichita's Orpheum theatre is still owned by the nonprofit Orpheum Performing Arts Centre LTD, and is managed by venue & event management company, Legends Global, making it a Sister venue to Intrust Bank Arena also Located in downtown Wichita that is Separately Owned by The Government of Sedgwick County. The venue is host to over 100 shows each year from all genres of entertainment. Nationally renowned performers regularly grace the historic Orpheum theatre stage, recent performers include: Dave Chappelle, "Weird Al" Yankovic, Elvis Costello, Keb' Mo', William Shatner, Lewis Black, Steven Stills, Blue October, Judy Collins, Paula Poundstone, Black Violin, Halestorm, David Blaine, Diana Krall, and David Sedaris, and most recently the cult classic hit tour of Mystery Science Theater 3000 Live! Additionally, the theatre is a primary venue for the annual Tallgrass Film Festival and curates its own annual film series.

== Architecture ==
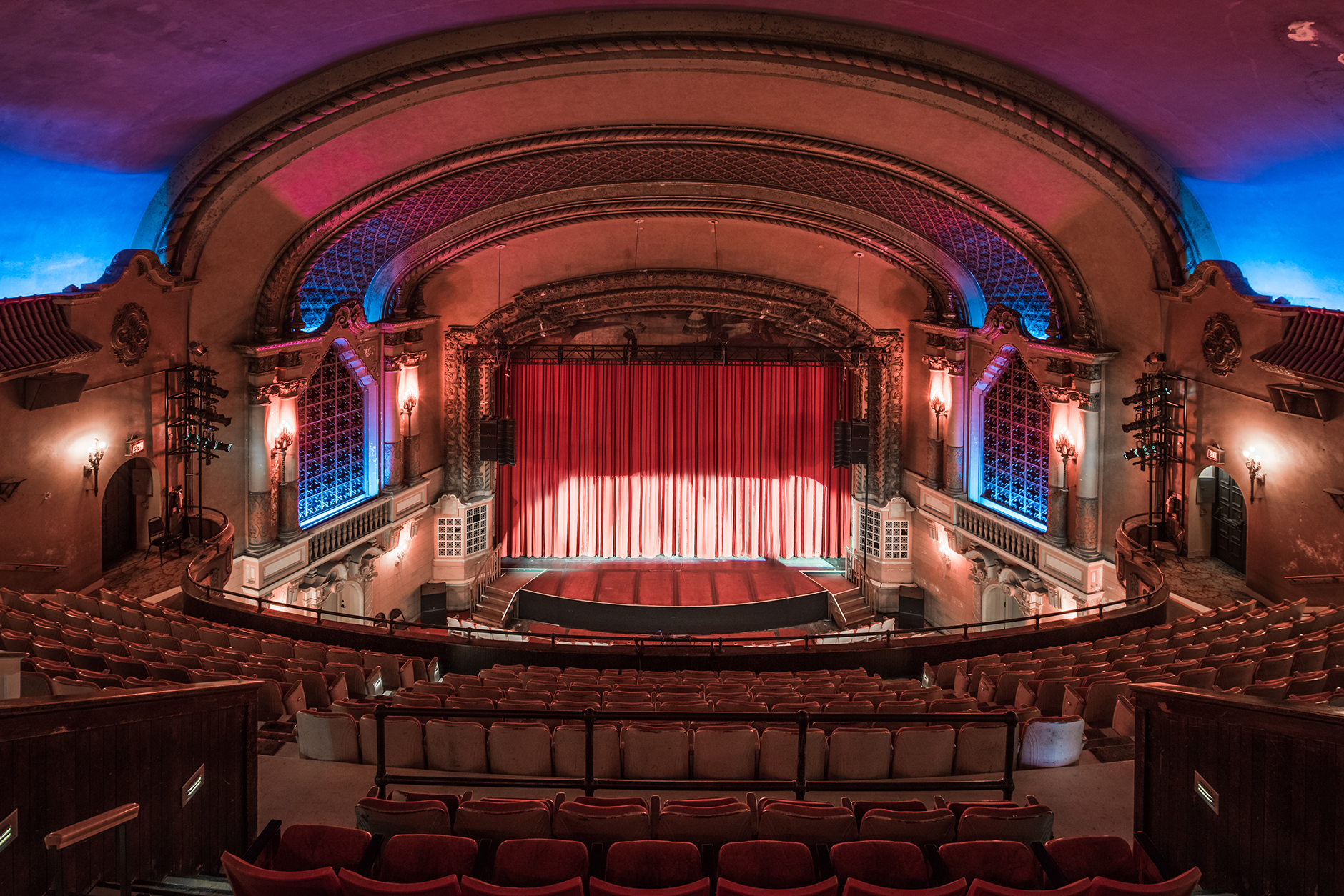
Orpheum Theatre interior (2016)

The theater it was one of three early theatres designed with elements of what would become known as the atmospheric style. Wichita's Orpheum design was that of a Spanish garden and courtyard.

The 42 feet (13 m) high by 40 feet (12 m) wide proscenium arch is the main feature of the auditorium. The sidewalls of the auditorium were accented by niches with mock tile roofs, grills, and wood lattice arches across the ceiling to create a courtyard effect.

While the theatre was originally designed with 1,700 seats, it now seats 1,286.

== See also ==
- Movie palaces list
