= Burrell Foley Fischer =

English architecture firm

Practice information
- Key architects: John Burrell, Aidan Ridyard
- Founded: 1982; 44 years ago

Website
- bff-architects.com

Burrell Foley Fischer is an English architectural practice based in London and the Midlands. The practice is made up of architects, conservation specialists and urban designers. It is known for its Heritage, Learning, Residential, Work and Cultural projects. The practice is an RIBA Chartered Practice and a signatory of the RIBA 2030 Climate Challenge. It is a member of Architects Declare and the Green Register of Construction Professionals.

== Formation ==
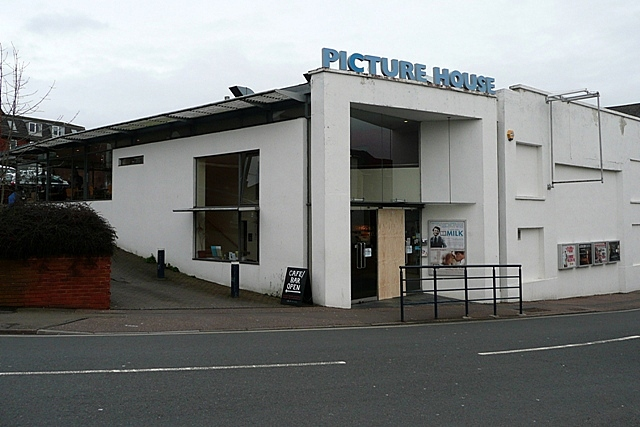
Exeter Picture House

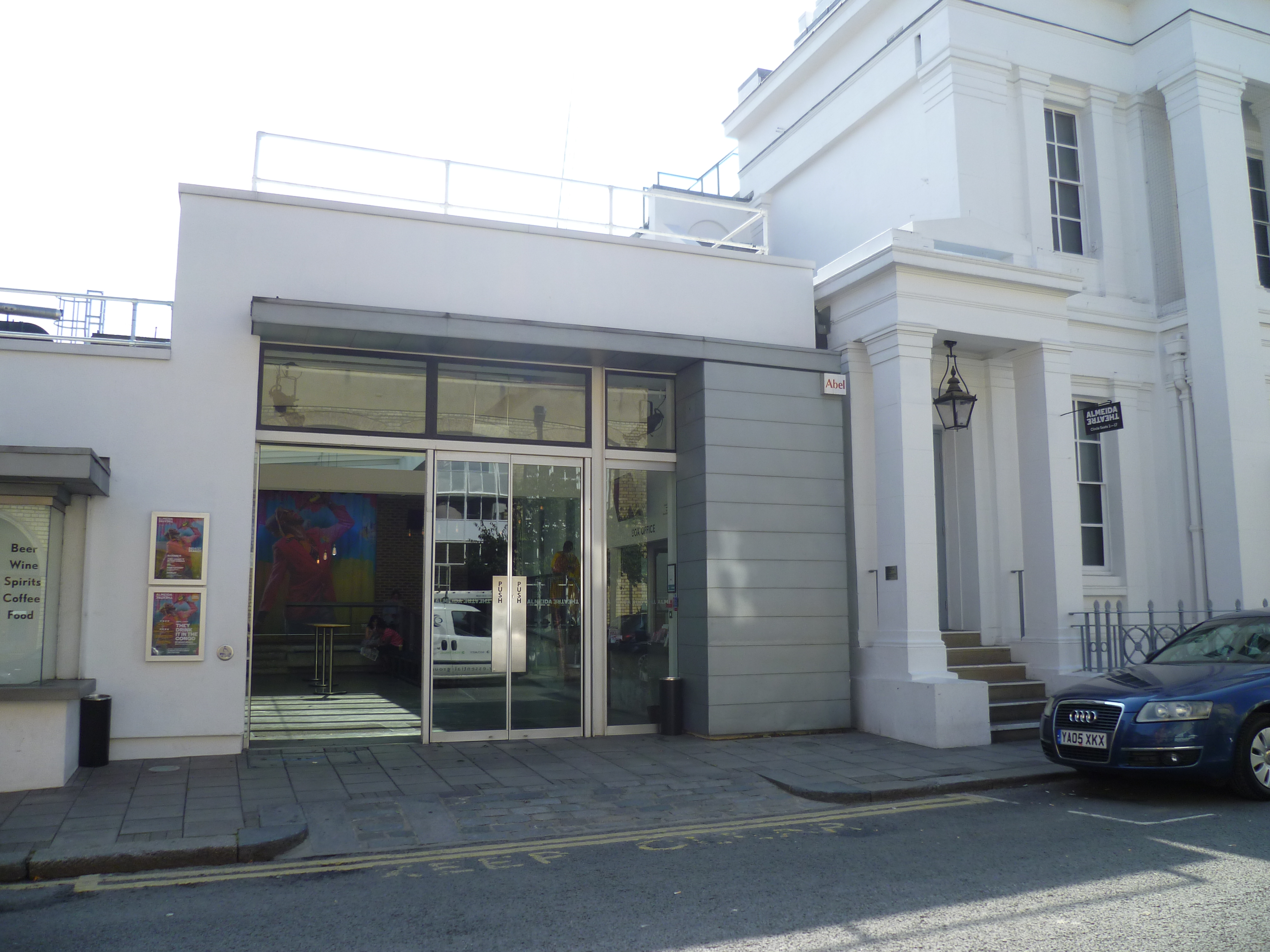
Almeida Theatre in 2016

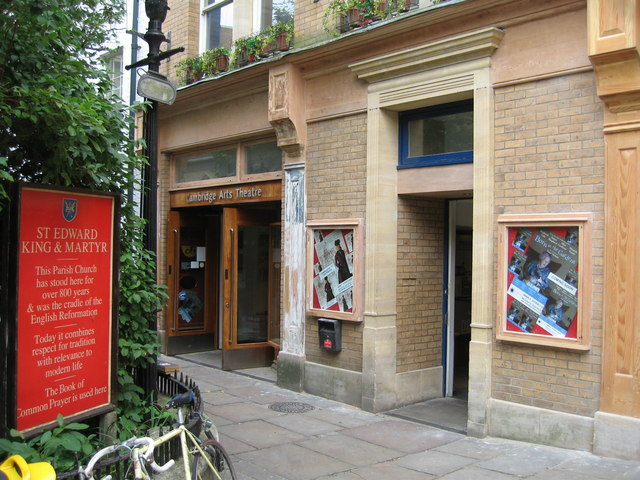
Cambridge Arts Theatre - new side entrance

The practice was originally formed as a partnership between John Burrell and Mark Foley in 1982, with Stefanie Fischer becoming a Partner in 1985. It was incorporated as a Limited Liability Partnership in July 2001; Aidan Ridyard joined as a Member in 2014. The current Members of the LLP are John Burrell and Aidan Ridyard; Stefanie Fischer and Mark Foley remain consultants to the practice.

== Performing arts ==
They designed the Exeter Picturehouse cinema.

Their Harbour Lights cinema in Southampton, opened in 1995, was shortlisted for a Sunday Times award and won a Civic Trust Commendation in 1997.`It is a steel, glass and wood building which provides public views of the historic harbour. The cinema was voted Britain's Best-Loved Independent Cinema in 2000 by the readers of Empire Magazine.

They were the designers of the £7.6 million refurbishment of the Almeida Theatre, described by The Guardian's Jonathan Glancey on its opening in 2003 as "likely to be a crowd-puller in its own right." and by The Independent as "splendidly refurbished".

They won the contract for the £19.8m Hall for Cornwall renovation project following a competitive tender. This was due to complete in 2020, although the impact of the COVID-19 pandemic has caused this to slip to 2021.

In 2013 Burrell Foley Fischer redesigned the foyer of the Cambridge Arts Theatre, rearranging the front-of-house and bar facilities and creating an extra entrance on St Edward's Passage. The project was commended in the sustainability category of the 2014 Cambridge Design and Construction awards.

== Education ==
Designed for Cranfield University, their Digital Aviation Research Technology Centre was completed in December 2020. The £65 million complex provides technology-rich laboratory environments with an open hangar for a 737-400 aircraft adjoining a live aerodrome.

They completed a new biophilic boarding and teaching building for Tring Park School for the Performing Arts.

== Sports ==
Burrell Foley Fisher were executive architects on the refurbishment of the Mound Stand at Lord's Cricket Ground and have designed a new grandstand at York Racecourse.

== Awards ==
The Campbeltown Picture House restoration won a Scottish Heritage Angels award for best restoration and shortlisted for the 2019 RIBAJ MacEwen award.

The Lewis Depot cinema was given a Friends of Lewes award, and highly commended in the South Downs National Park design awards.
