= Brenkert Brenograph Jr. =

The Brenkert Brenograph Jr. was a projector used in atmospheric theatres to project moving clouds over ceilings painted blue. The effect created the illusion that theatre patrons were outdoors. The device was used primarily in theatre designs of John Eberson.

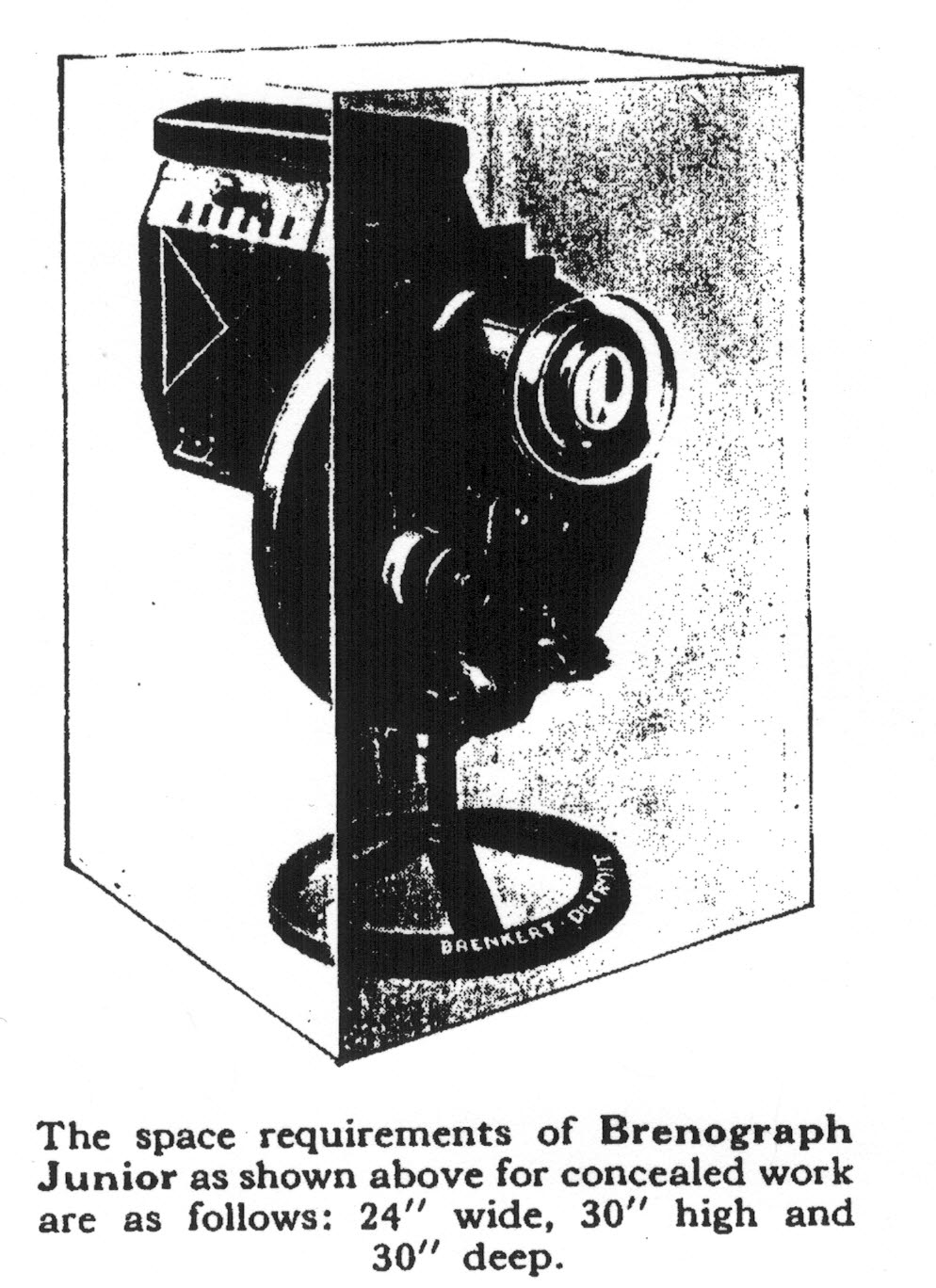
The Brenkert Brenograph Jr.

The machine was manufactured by the Brenkert Light Projection Company of Detroit. The company sold the projector for $225 in the 1920s.

The projector operated automatically with a universal electrical motor, capable of varying speeds. It used a powerful 1500 watt light bulb to display nimbus and cumulus clouds. The clouds were images on a strip of negatives that moved continuously in front of the light. The negatives were affixed to a circular disc that rotated once every 105 minutes—about the length of a typical performance.

The projector was small enough to be hidden in the theatre architectural design so that the illusion of floating clouds would be maintained.

== Notes and references ==
- Craig, Robert M. Atlanta Architecture: Art Deco to Modern Classic, 1929–1959. Gretna, LA: Pelican Pub., 1974, p. 74.
- Hoffman, Scott L. A Theatre History of Marion, Ohio: John Eberson's Palace and Beyond. Charlotte, NC: The History Press, 2015, p. 30, 32–34, 62.
- Welling, David. Cinema Houston: From Nickelodeon to Cineplex. Austin, TX: U. Texas P., 2010, p. 54.
- The Pantagraph (Bloomington, IL), May 22, 1983, p. 13.
