= Movie palace =

Type of movie theater

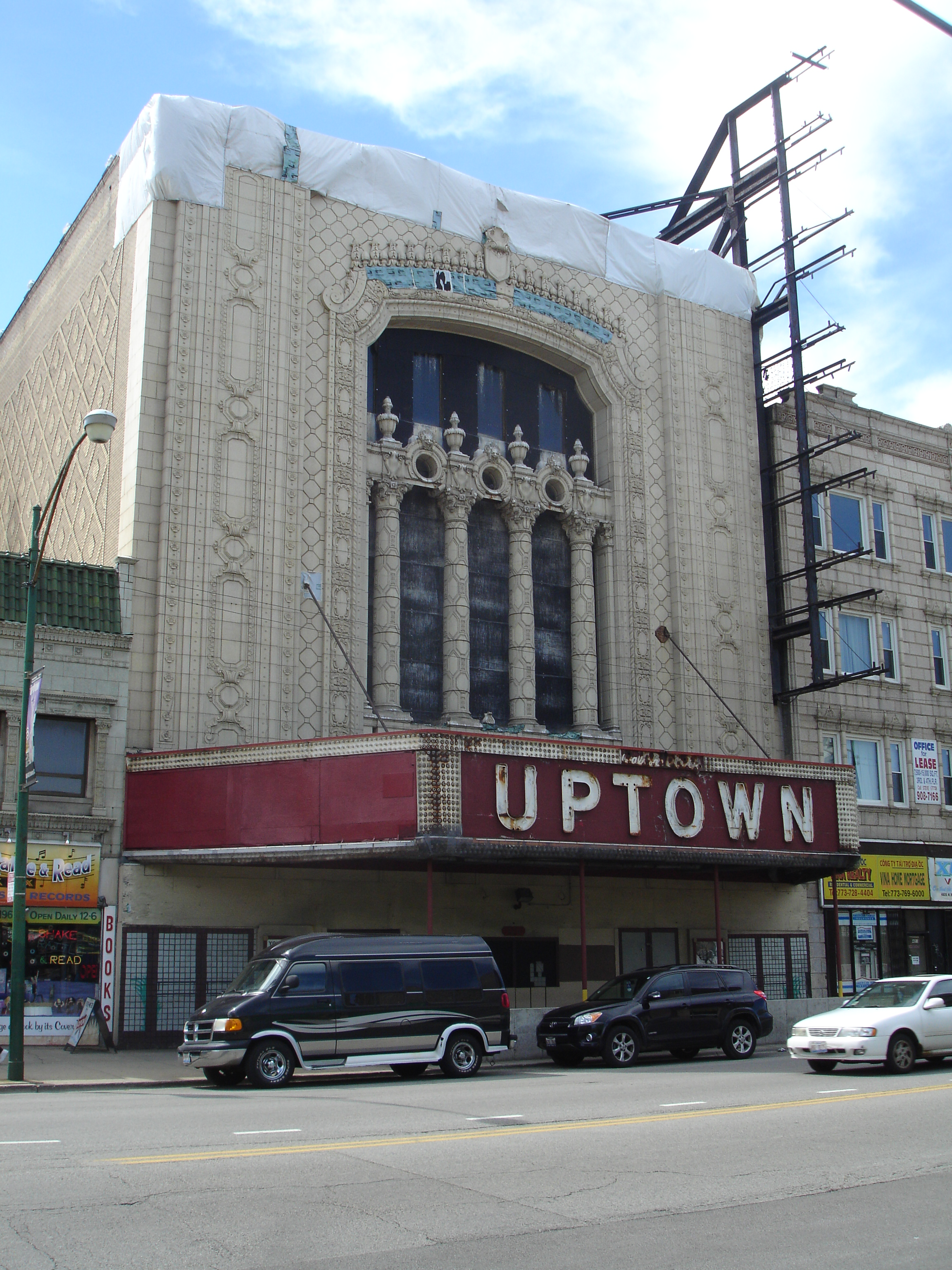
The Uptown Theatre in Chicago

A movie palace (or picture palace in the United Kingdom) is a large, elaborately decorated movie theater built from the 1910s to the 1940s. The late 1920s saw the peak of the movie palace, with hundreds opening every year between 1925 and 1930. With the rise of television in the 1950s, movie attendance dropped, while the rising popularity of large multiplex chains in the 1980s and 1990s signaled the obsolescence of single-screen theaters. Many movie palaces were razed or converted into multiple-screen venues or performing arts centers, though some have undergone restoration and reopened to the public as historic buildings.

There are three architectural design types of movie palaces: the classical-style movie palace, with opulent, luxurious architecture; the atmospheric theatre, which has an auditorium ceiling that resembles an open sky as a defining feature; and the Art Deco theaters that became popular in the 1930s.

== Background ==
Paid exhibition of motion pictures began on April 14, 1894, at Andrew M. Holland's phonograph store, located at 1155 Broadway in New York City, with the Kinetoscope. Dropping a nickel in a machine allowed a viewer to see a short motion picture, devoid of plot. The machines were installed in Kinetoscope parlors, hotels, department stores, bars and drugstores in large American cities. The machines were popular from 1894 to 1896, but by the turn of the century had almost disappeared as Americans rejected the solitary viewing experience and boring entertainment.

Around 1900, motion pictures became a small part of vaudeville theatres. The competitive vaudeville theatre market caused owners to constantly look for new entertainment, and the motion picture helped create demand, although the new form of entertainment was not the main draw for patrons. It was often used as a "chaser"—shown as the end of the performance to chase the audience from the theatre. These theatres were designed much like legitimate theatres. The Beaux-Arts architecture of these theatres was formal and ornate. They were not designed for motion pictures, but rather live stage performances.

In 1902, the storefront theatre was born at Thomas Lincoln Tally's Electric Theatre in Los Angeles. These soon spread throughout the country as empty storefronts were equipped with chairs, a Vitascope projector, a muslin sheet on which the motion picture was exhibited, darkened windows, and a box by the door to service as a ticket office (literally, the "box office"). Storefront theatres, supplied with motion pictures made in Chicago and New York, spread throughout America. These theatres exhibited a motion picture at a specific time during the day.

Air domes also became popular in warm climates and in the summertime in northern climates. With no roof and only side walls or fences, the air domes allowed patrons to view motion pictures in a venue that was cooler than the stifling atmosphere of the storefront theatre.

In 1905, the nickelodeon was born. Rather than exhibiting one program a night, the nickelodeon offered continuous motion picture entertainment for five cents. They were widely popular. By 1910, nickelodeons grossed $91 million in the United States. The nickelodeons were like simple storefront theatres, but differed in the continuous showings and the marketing to women and families.

The movie house, in a building designed specifically for motion picture exhibition, was the last step before the movie palace. Comfort was paramount, with upholstered seating and climate controls. One of the first movie houses was Tally's Broadway Theater in Los Angeles.

== History ==
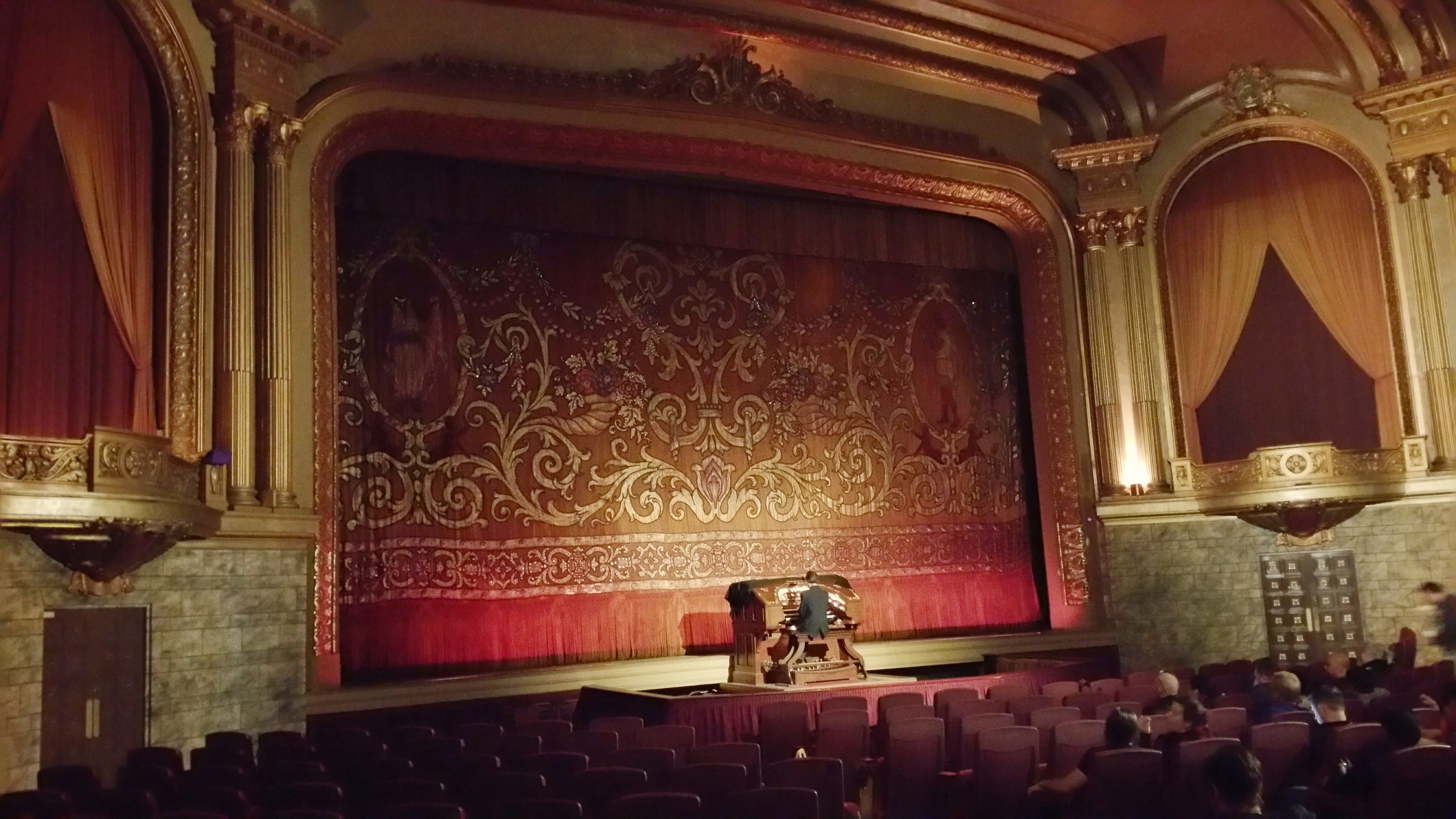
The interior of the Grand Lake Theatre, built in 1926

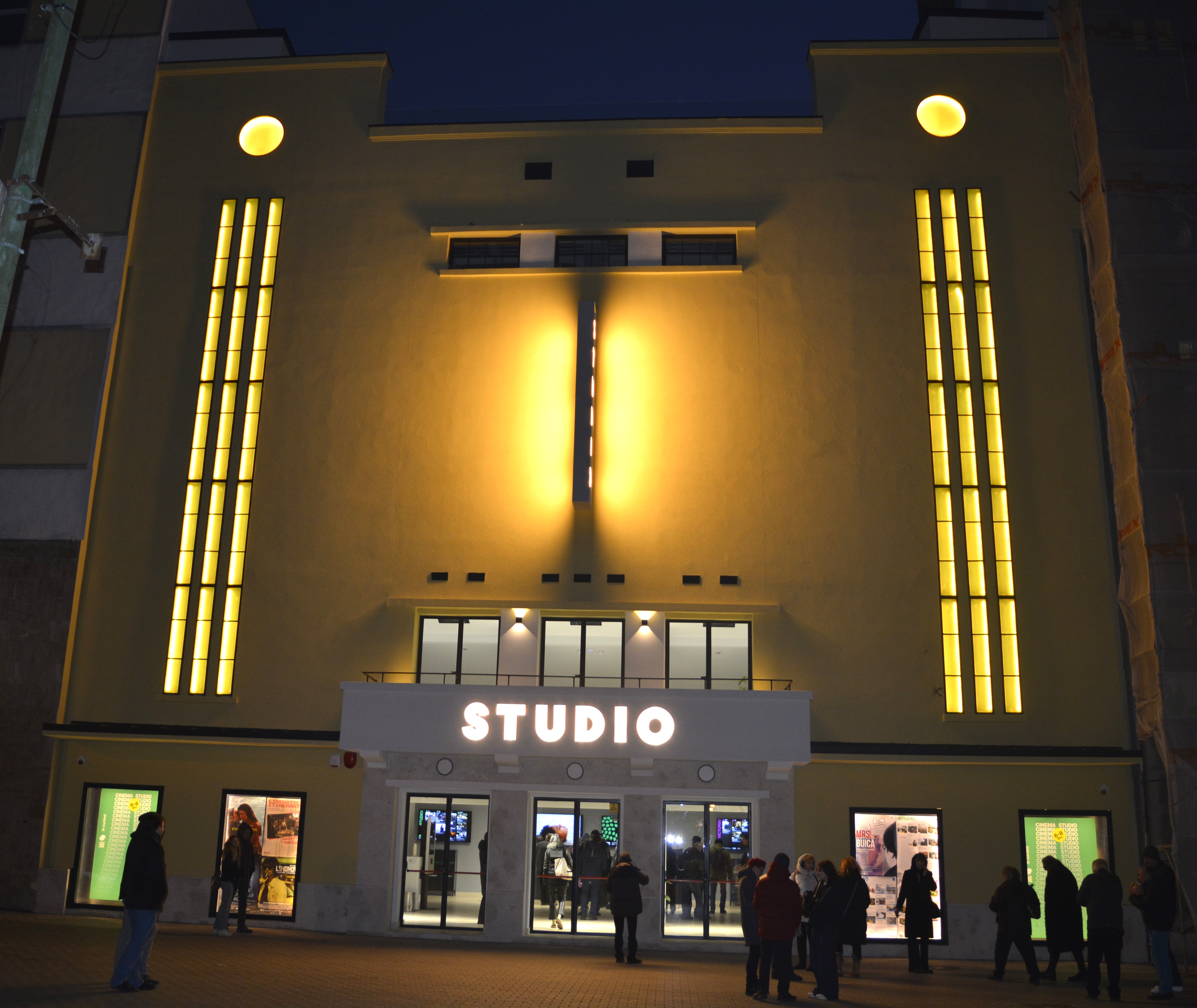
Studio Cinema in Timișoara, built in 1938

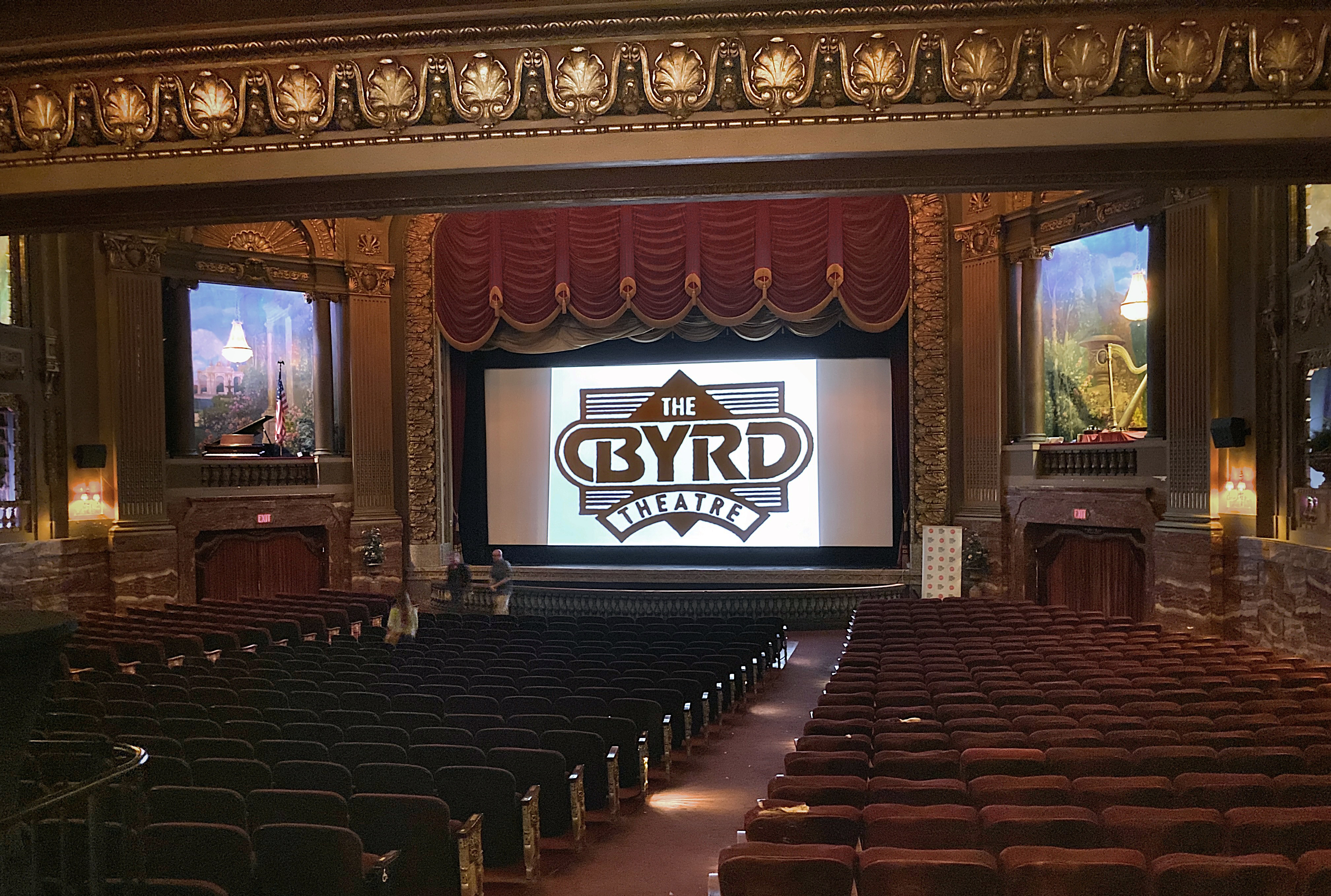
The interior of the Byrd Theatre, a 1928 movie palace in Richmond, Virginia, shown in 2021.

The movie palace was developed as the step beyond the small theaters of the 1900s and 1910s. As motion pictures developed as an art form, theatre infrastructure needed to change. Storefront theatres and nickelodeons catered to the busy work lives and limited budgets of the lower and middle classes. Motion pictures were generally only thought to be for the lower classes at that time as they were simple, short, and cost only five cents to attend. While the middle class regularly began to attend the nickelodeons by the early 1910s the upperclass continued to attend stage theater performances such as opera and big-time vaudeville. However, as more sophisticated, complex, and longer films featuring prominent stage actors were developed, the upperclass desires to attend the movies began to increase and a demand for higher class theaters began to develop. Nickelodeons could not meet this demand as the upperclass feared the moral repercussions of intermingling between women and children with immigrants. There were also real concerns over the physical safety of the nickelodeon theaters themselves as they were often cramped with little ventilation and the nitrate film stock used at the time was extremely flammable.

The demand for an upscale film theater, suitable to exhibit films to the upperclass, was first met when the Regent Theater, designed by Thomas Lamb, was opened in February 1913, becoming the first ever movie palace. However the theater's location in Harlem prompted many to suggest that the theater be moved to Broadway alongside the stage theaters. These desires were satisfied when Lamb built the Strand Theatre on Broadway, which was opened in 1914 by Mitchel H. Mark at the cost of one million dollars. This opening was the first example of a success in drawing the upper middle class to the movies and it spurred others to follow suit. As their name implies movie palaces were advertised to, "make the average citizen feel like royalty." Architect George Rapp said of his Uptown Theater, "These are not impractical attempts at showing off. Here is a shrine to democracy where there are not privileged patrons. The wealthy rub elbows with the poor -- and are the better for this contact." To accomplish this these theaters were outfitted with a plethora of amenities such as larger sitting areas, air conditioning, and even childcare services.

Between 1914 and 1922 over 4,000 movie palaces were opened. Notable pioneers of movies palaces include the Chicago firm of Rapp and Rapp, which designed the Chicago, Uptown, and Oriental Theatres. S.L. "Roxy" Rothafel, originated the deluxe presentation of films with themed stage shows. Sid Grauman, built the first movie palace on the West Coast, Los Angeles' Million Dollar Theater, in 1918.

=== Decline ===
Following World War II, movie ticket sales began to rapidly decline due to the widespread adoption of television and mass migration of the population from the cities (where all the movie palaces had been built) into the suburbs. The closing of most movie palaces occurred after United States v. Paramount Pictures, Inc. in 1948, which ordered all of the major film studios to sell their theaters. Most of the newly independent theaters could not continue to operate on the low admissions sales of the time without the financial support of the major studios and were forced to close. Many were able to stay in business by converting to operate as race or pornography theaters.

The death knell for single-screen movie theaters (including movie palaces) arrived with the development of the multiplex in the 1980s and the megaplex in the 1990s. Some movie palaces were able to stay in business only by getting out of the way, at least with respect to the highest-grossing first-run films for which they were no longer viable exhibition venues. They became second-run theaters or specialized in showing art house films.

By 2004, only about a quarter of U.S. movie theaters still had only one screen, and the average number of screens per theater was 6.1.

== Design ==
Eberson specialized in the subgenre of "atmospheric" theatres. His first, of the 500 in his career, was the 1923 Majestic in Houston, Texas. The atmospherics usually conveyed the impression of sitting in an outdoor courtyard, surrounded by highly ornamented asymmetrical facades and exotic flora and fauna, underneath a dark blue canopy; when the lights went out, a specially designed projector, the Brenograph, was used to project clouds, and special celestial effects on the ceiling.

Lamb's style was initially based on the more traditional, "hardtop" form patterned on opera houses, but was no less ornate. His theaters evolved from relatively restrained neo-classic designs in the 1910s to those with elaborate baroque and Asian motifs in the late 1920s.

The movie palace's signature look was one of extravagant ornamentation. The theaters were often designed with an eclectic exoticism where a variety of referenced visual styles collided wildly with one another. French Baroque, High Gothic, Moroccan, Mediterranean, Spanish Gothic, Hindu, Babylonian, Aztec, Mayan, Orientalist, Italian Renaissance, and (after the discovery of King Tut's tomb in 1922) Egyptian Revival were all variously mixed and matched. This wealth of ornament was not merely for aesthetic effect. It was meant to create a fantasy environment to attract moviegoers and involved a type of social engineering, distraction, and traffic management, meant to work on human bodies and minds in a specific way. Today, most of the surviving movie palaces operate as regular theaters, showcasing concerts, plays and operas.

== List of movie palaces ==
This is a list of selected movie palaces, with location and year of construction.

Table of Selected Movie Palaces
Movie Palaces	City	State/Country	Year built/Opened	Other Names
Akron Civic Theatre	Akron	Ohio	1929	(formerly Loew's (Akron) Theatre)
Alabama Theatre	Birmingham	Alabama	1927	
Alameda Theatre	Alameda	California	1932	
Alexandria Theater	San Francisco	California	1923	UA Alexandria
Alhambra Theatre	San Francisco	California	1926	
Albee Theater	Cincinnati	Ohio	1927	
Alex Theatre	Glendale	California	1925	
Arcada Theater	St. Charles	Illinois	1926	
Arlington Theater	Santa Barbara	California	1931	
Arvest Midland Theatre	Kansas City	Missouri	1927	
Avalon Regal Theater	Chicago	Illinois	1927	
Aztec Theatre	San Antonio	Texas	1926	
Bagdad Theatre	Portland	Oregon	1927	
Bama Theatre	Tuscaloosa	Alabama	1938	
Biograph Theater	Chicago	Illinois	1914	
Boyd Theatre	Philadelphia	Pennsylvania	1928	
Brauntex Theatre	New Braunfels	Texas	1942	
Broadway Theatre	Mount Pleasant	Michigan	1920	
Byrd Theatre	Richmond	Virginia	1928	
California Theatre	San Jose	California	1927	
The Capitol	Melbourne	Australia	1924	
Capitol Cinema (Ottawa)	Ottawa, Ontario	Canada	1920	
Capitol Theatre (Rome)	Rome	New York	1928	
Capitol Theatre (Porter Chester)	Port Chester	New York	1926	
Capitol Theatre	Vancouver, British Columbia	Canada	1921	
Carlton Cinema	London	England	1930	
Carolina Theatre	Durham	North Carolina	1926	
Carpenter Theater	Richmond	Virginia	1928	
Castro Theatre	San Francisco	California	1922	
Carthay Circle Theatre	Los Angeles	California	1926	demolished 1969
Commodore Picture House	Liverpool	England	1930	
Chicago Theatre	Chicago	Illinois	1921	
Circle Theatre	Indianapolis	Indiana	1916	
Congress Theater	Chicago	Illinois	1926	
Coolidge Corner Theatre	Brookline	Massachusetts	1933	
Coronado Theatre	Rockford	Illinois	1927	
Crest Theatre	Sacramento	California	1912	
Del Mar Theatre	Santa Cruz	California	1936	
Dominion Cinema	Edinburgh	Scotland	1938	
Duke of York's Picture House	Brighton	England	1910	One of the UK's oldest continuously-running cinemas.
Egyptian Theatre (Boise)	Boise	Idaho	1927	
Egyptian Theatre (DeKalb)	DeKalb	Illinois	1929	
El Capitan Theatre	Los Angeles	California	1926	
El Portal Theatre	Los Angeles	California	1926	
The Electric Cinema	London	England	1910	One of the UK's oldest continuously-running cinemas.
Elgin and Winter Garden Theatres	Toronto, Ontario	Canada	1913	
Embassy Theatre (Fort Wayne)	Fort Wayne	Indiana	1928	
Empire Theater	Sellersburg	Indiana	1920s	
Everyman Cinema, Muswell Hill	London	England	1935	
Englert Theatre	Iowa City	Iowa	1912	
Fargo Theatre	Fargo	North Dakota	1926	
Florida Theatre	Jacksonville	Florida	1927	
Fourth Avenue Theatre	Anchorage	Alaska	1947	
Fox Theatre (Atlanta)	Atlanta	Georgia	1929	the only surviving movie palace in Atlanta
Fox Theatre (Bakersfield)	Bakersfield	California	1930	
Fox Theatre (Detroit)	Detroit	Michigan	1928	
Fox Theatre (Salinas)	Salinas	California	1921	
Fox Theatre (San Diego)	San Diego	California	1929	now Jacobs Music Center
Fox Theatre (San Francisco)	San Francisco	California	1929	
Fox Theater (Spokane)	Spokane	Washington	1931	
Fox Theatre (St. Louis)	St. Louis	Missouri	1929	also known as the "Fabulous Fox Theatre."
Garde Arts Center	New London	Connecticut	1926	
Garneau Theatre	Edmonton, Alberta	Canada	1940	
Gateway Theatre	Chicago	Illinois	1930	
Gaumont State	London	England	1937	
Golden State Theatre	Monterey	California	1926	
Granada Theatre	Sherbrooke	Quebec	1929	
Granada, Tooting	London	England	1931	
Grand Lake Theater	Oakland	California	1926	
Grauman's Chinese Theatre	Los Angeles	California	1927	
Grauman's Egyptian Theatre	Los Angeles	California	1922	
Hammersmith Apollo	London	England	1932	
Hawaii Theatre	Honolulu	Hawaii	1922	
Hayden Orpheum Picture Palace	Sydney	Australia	1935	
Hollywood Pacific Theatre	Los Angeles	California	1928	
Indiana Theatre (Indianapolis)	Indianapolis	Indiana	1933	
Indiana Theatre (Terre Haute)	Terre Haute	Indiana	1922	
Imperial Theatre	Augusta	Georgia	1918	
Ironwood Theatre	Ironwood	Michigan	1928	
Jefferson Theatre	Beaumont	Texas	1927	
Jefferson Theater	Charlottesville	Virginia	1912	
The Kensington Cinema	London	England	1926	(now Odeon)
Kentucky Theatre	Lexington	Kentucky	1922	
Lafayette Theatre	Suffern	New York	1924	
Landmark Theatre	Richmond	Virginia	1926	
Landmark Theatre	Syracuse	New York	1928	(formerly Loew's State Theatre)
Lensic Theater	Santa Fe	New Mexico	1931	
Loew's 175th Street Theater	New York City	New York	1930	
Loew's Grand Theatre	Atlanta	Georgia	1920s	
Loew's Jersey Theatre	Jersey City	New Jersey	1929	
Loew's Kings Theatre	Brooklyn	New York	1929	
Loew's Paradise Theatre	The Bronx	New York	1929	
Loew's Penn Theatre	Pittsburgh	Pennsylvania	1927	(now Heinz Hall)
Loew's State Palace Theatre	New Orleans	Louisiana	1926	
Loew's State Theatre	Providence	Rhode Island	1928	(now Providence Performing Arts Center)
Loew's State Theatre	Norfolk	Virginia	1929	now TCC Jeanne & George Roper Performing Arts Center
Loew's Tara Cinema	Atlanta	Georgia	1968	now a multiplex; renamed the Lefont Tara years later
Loew's Valencia Theatre	Queens	New York	1929	
Los Angeles Theatre	Los Angeles	California	1931	
Lorenzo Theatre	San Lorenzo	California	1947	currently owned by the Lorenzo Theatre Foundation.
Lucas Theatre	Savannah	Georgia	1921	
The Madison Theatre	Peoria	Illinois	1920	As of 2022, was in restoration by The Madison Preservation Association.
Mainstreet Theater	Kansas City	Missouri	1921	(formerly the Empire and the RKO Missouri)
Majestic Theatre	Dallas	Texas	1921	
Majestic Theatre	San Antonio	Texas	1929	
Manchester Apollo	Manchester	England	1938	
Mark Strand Theatre	New York City	New York	1914	
Martin's Cinerama	Atlanta	Georgia	1962	
Michigan Theater	Ann Arbor	Michigan	1928	
Michigan Theatre	Detroit	Michigan	1926	
Michigan Theatre	Muskegon	Michigan	1929	(now Frauenthal Theater)
Miller Theater	Augusta	Georgia	1940	
Million Dollar Theater	Los Angeles	California	1918	
Norwalk Theatre	Norwalk	Ohio	1941	
North Park Theatre	Buffalo	New York	1920	
Odeon Leicester Square	London	England	1937	
Odeon Cinema	Manchester	England	1930	
Odeon North End Cinema	Portsmouth	England	1936	
Ohio Theatre	Columbus	Ohio	1928	
Ohio Theatre	Cleveland	Ohio	1921	
Olympia Theatre	Miami	Florida	1926	
Oriental Theatre	Chicago	Illinois	1926	
Oriental Theatre	Milwaukee	Wisconsin	1927	
Orpheum Theatre	Sioux City	Iowa	1927	
Orpheum Theatre	Memphis	Tennessee	1928	
Orpheum Theatre	Vancouver, British Columbia	Canada	1927	
Orpheum Theatre	Wichita	Kansas	1922	
Ouimetoscope	Montreal, Quebec	Canada	1906	(first Canadian theater dedicated to exclusively to showing movies)
Oxford Picture Hall	Whitstable	England	1912	
Palace Theatre	Syracuse	New York	1924	
Palace Theatre	Albany	New York	1931	
Palace Theatre (Marion)	Marion	Ohio	1928	
Palace Theatre	Cleveland	Ohio	1922	
Palace Theatre (Canton)	Canton	Ohio	1926	
Palace Theatre	Lorain	Ohio	1928	
Palace Theatre	Louisville	Kentucky	1928	
Palace Theatre	Columbus	Ohio	1927	
Pantages Theatre (Los Angeles)	Los Angeles	California	1930	
Pantages Theatre (Salt Lake City)	Salt Lake City	Utah	1918	
Paramount Theatre, Abilene	Abilene	Texas	1930	
Paramount Theatre	Anderson	Indiana	1929	
Paramount Theatre	Aurora	Illinois	1931	
Paramount Theatre (Mn)	Austin	Minnesota	1929	
Paramount Theatre (Tx)	Austin	Texas	1915	
Paramount Theatre (Cedar R)	Cedar Rapids	Iowa	1928	
Paramount Theater (Denver)	Denver	Colorado	1930	
Paramount Theatre	Kankakee	Illinois	1931	
Paramount Theatre	Los Angeles	California	1923	demolished 1960
Paramount Theatre	Oakland	California	1931	
Paramount Theatre	Portland	Oregon	1928	(now the Arlene Schnitzer Concert Hall, originally the Portland Publix Theatre)
Paramount Theatre (Seattle)	Seattle	Washington	1927	
Paramount Theater (Springfield)	Springfield	Massachusetts	1926	(formerly known as Julia Sanderson Theater and The Hippodrome)
Peery's Egyptian Theatre	Ogden	Utah	1924	
Pickwick Theatre	Park Ridge	Illinois	1928	
Phoenix Cinema	East Finchley	England	1912	One of the UK's oldest continuously-running cinemas.
Plaza Cinema	Port Talbot	Wales	1940	
Plaza Theatre	El Paso	Texas	1930	
Polk Theatre	Lakeland	Florida	1928	
Fox Theater	Pomona	California	1931	
Princess Theatre	Edmonton, Alberta	Canada	1915	
Quo Vadis Entertainment Center	Westland	Michigan	1966	
Radio City Music Hall	New York City	New York	1932	
Rahway Theatre	Rahway	New Jersey	1926	(now the Union County Performing Arts Center)
Redford Theatre	Detroit	Michigan	1928	
Regent Theatre	Mudgee (New South Wales)	Australia	1935	
The Rex	Berkhamsted	England	1938	
Rialto Theatre	Montreal, Quebec	Canada	1924	
Rialto Square Theatre	Joliet	Illinois	1926	
Ritz Theatre	Tiffin	Ohio	1928	
Riviera Theater	Chicago	Illinois	1918	
Riviera Theatre	North Tonawanda	New York	1926	
Rockingham Theatre	Reidsville	North Carolina	1929	
Roxie Theater	San Francisco	California	1909	
Roxy Theatre	New York City	New York	1927	
Roxy Theatre	Atlanta	Georgia	1926	renamed the Roxy in 1938
Roxy Theatre	Saskatoon, Saskatchewan	Canada	1930	
Saenger Theatre	Mobile	Alabama	1927	
Saenger Theatre	New Orleans	Louisiana	1927	
Saenger Theatre	Pensacola	Florida	1925	
Saenger Theatre	Hattiesburg	Mississippi	1929	
Senator Theatre	Baltimore	Maryland	1939	
Shea's Performing Arts Center	Buffalo	New York	1926	
Snowdon Theatre	Montreal, Quebec	Canada	1937	
Stanford Theatre	Palo Alto	California	1925	restored 1989
Stanley Theater	Jersey City	New Jersey	1928	(now an Assembly Hall of Jehovah's Witnesses)
Stanley Theater	Pittsburgh	Pennsylvania	1928	(now Benedum Center)
Stanley Theatre	Utica	New York	1928	
Stanley Theatre	Vancouver, British Columbia	Canada	1930	(now Stanley Industrial Alliance Stage)
State Cinema (now Focal Point Cinema & Cafe)	Hastings	New Zealand	1933	
State Theater	Cleveland	Ohio	1921	
State Theatre	Kalamazoo	Michigan	1927	
State Theatre	Woodland	California	1936	
State Theatre Center for the Arts	Uniontown	Pennsylvania	1922	
The Strand Theatre	Marietta	Georgia	1935	
St. George Theatre	Staten Island	New York	1929	
Studio Cinema	Timișoara	Romania	1938	formerly the Thalia Cinema
Suffolk Theater	Riverhead	New York	1933	
Sun Theatre	Melbourne (Victoria)	Australia	1938	
Sunnyvale Theater	Sunnyvale	California	1926	formerly the New Strand Theater
Tampa Theatre	Tampa	Florida	1926	
Tennessee Theatre	Knoxville	Tennessee	1928	
Tower Theatre	Sacramento	California	1938	
Troxy	London	England	1933	
United Artists Theatre	Los Angeles	California	1927	reopened in 2014 as part of the Ace Hotel
Uptown Theater	Washington	D.C.	1933	
Uptown Theatre	Chicago	Illinois	1925	
Uptown Theater	Minneapolis	Minnesota	1913	
Uptown Theatre	Toronto, Ontario	Canada	1920	
Uptown Theatre	Utica	New York	1927	
Varsity Theatre	Palo Alto	California	1927	
Victory Theatre	Evansville	Indiana	1921	formerly the Loew's Victory
Virginia Theatre	Champaign	Illinois	1921	
Warner Grand Theatre	San Pedro/Los Angeles	California	1931	
Warner Theatre	Erie	Pennsylvania	1931	
Warner Theatre	Youngstown	Ohio	1931	(now Powers Auditorium)
Warnors Theatre	Fresno	California	1928	
Washoe Theater	Anaconda	Montana	1931	
Weinberg Center	Frederick	Maryland	1926	(formerly the Tivoli Theatre)
Wilshire Theater	Beverly Hills	California	1930	
Wiltern Theatre	Los Angeles	California	1930	

See also

- Timothy L. Pflueger
- A. J. Balaban
- John Eberson
