= Uptown Theatre (Utica, New York) =

Historic movie theater in Utica, New York

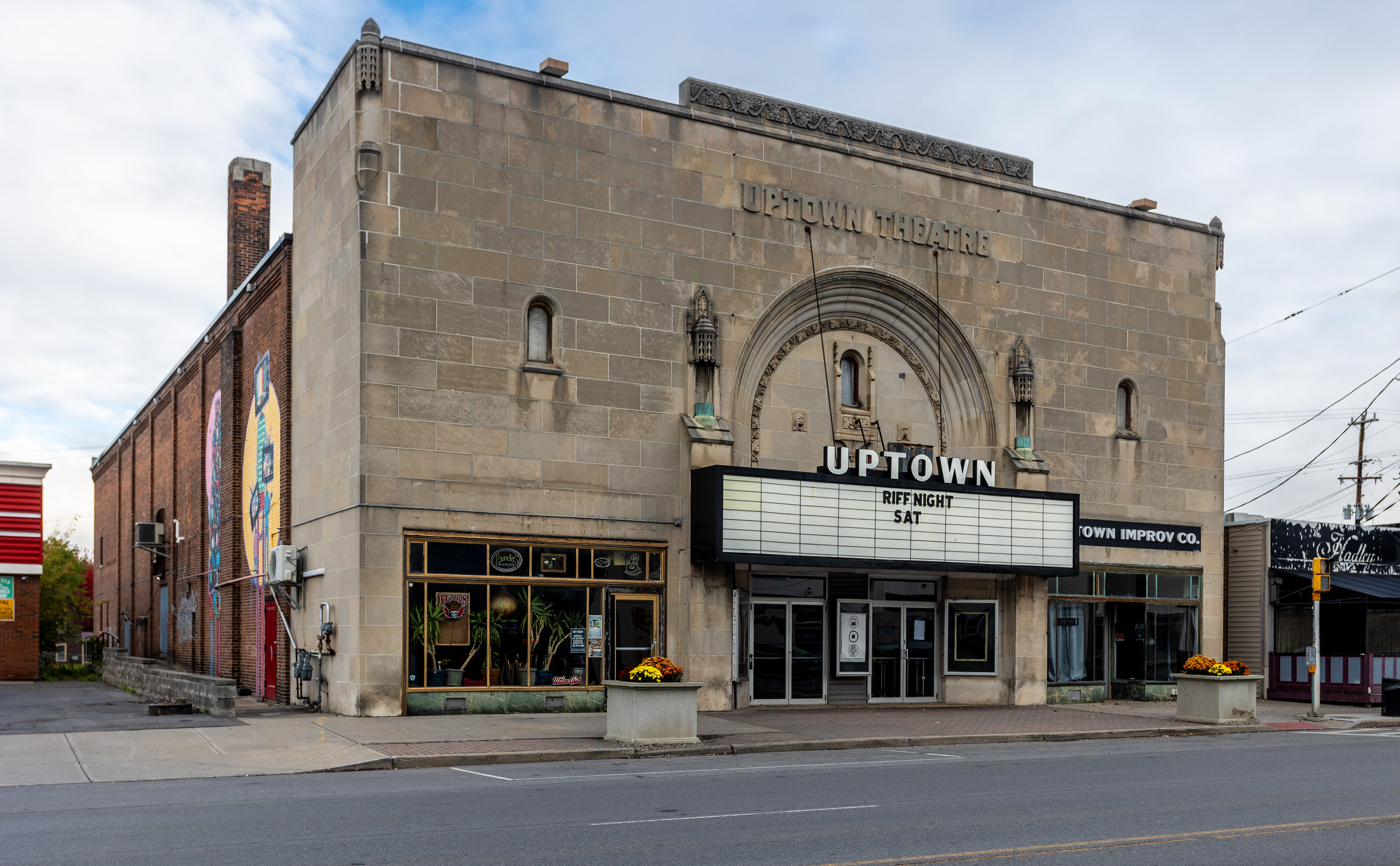
- Interactive map of Uptown Theatre
- Address: 2014 Genesee Street; Utica, New York; United States
- Capacity: 1500 (c. 1927); 400 (c. 2013)
- Type: Movie palace
- Screen: 1

Construction
- Opened: December 29, 1927
- Closed: September 2013

Website
- www.utcany.org
- Uptown Theater
- Location within New York Location within the United States
- Coordinates: 43°5′12″N 75°15′52″W
- NRHP reference No.: SG100005466
- Added to NRHP: August 17, 2020

The Uptown Theatre is a historic movie theater in Utica, New York. It opened on December 29, 1927, during the silent film and Vaudeville eras, and is the city's oldest surviving theater, predating the Stanley Theater by eight months. It was part of the Kallet chain of movie theaters, like the Capitol Theatre in nearby Rome and other theaters no longer standing throughout Upstate New York.

== History ==
A boxing arena, the Utica Stadium, was razed to make way for the Uptown Theatre. A $25,000, three-manual organ was installed during construction, placed on an elevator lift beneath the orchestra pit. At opening the theater seated 1,500: it was the first theater in Utica to use stadium seating.

With the rise of the multiplex theater in the '70s and '80s, the Uptown shifted to showing second-run movies. The theater changed management and business strategy several times through the '90s and early 2000s. In 2012 the owner combined the three divided theaters into a single theater, began running first-run films, and hosted live music and other events. Despite these efforts, it was closed and put up for sale in September 2013. The owner mentioned being unable to afford the conversion to digital cinema and a perceived lack of interest from the community. The Uptown was scheduled for foreclosure auction in 2016 but the auction was postponed indefinitely.

It remained vacant until 2018, when it was purchased by the non-profit group Uptown Theatre for Creative Arts (UTCA). Under the terms of the purchase agreement, M&T Bank forgave the $400,000 mortgage on the property and donated the building to UTCA, while UTCA took responsibility for $27,000 in back taxes owed to the city of Utica. In early 2019 UTCA received a gift of $10,000 to repair the Uptown's marquee and replace its exterior lights with LED lighting. Although UTCA has renovated the lobby and adjacent storefronts, the auditorium and stage are not yet fully usable.

In August 2020, the Uptown was added to the National Register of Historic Places.

As of 2023 under the new ownership the Uptown Theatre has hosted Stand-up comedy and Improvisational theatre shows alongside classes and other events in spaces located outside the auditorium. The new owners have also expressed interest in using the auditorium for film screening and live performances once it becomes fully usable.
