= Strand Theatre (Marietta, Georgia) =

Historic movie theatre in Marietta, Georgia

Coordinates: 33.95344°N 84.54918°W

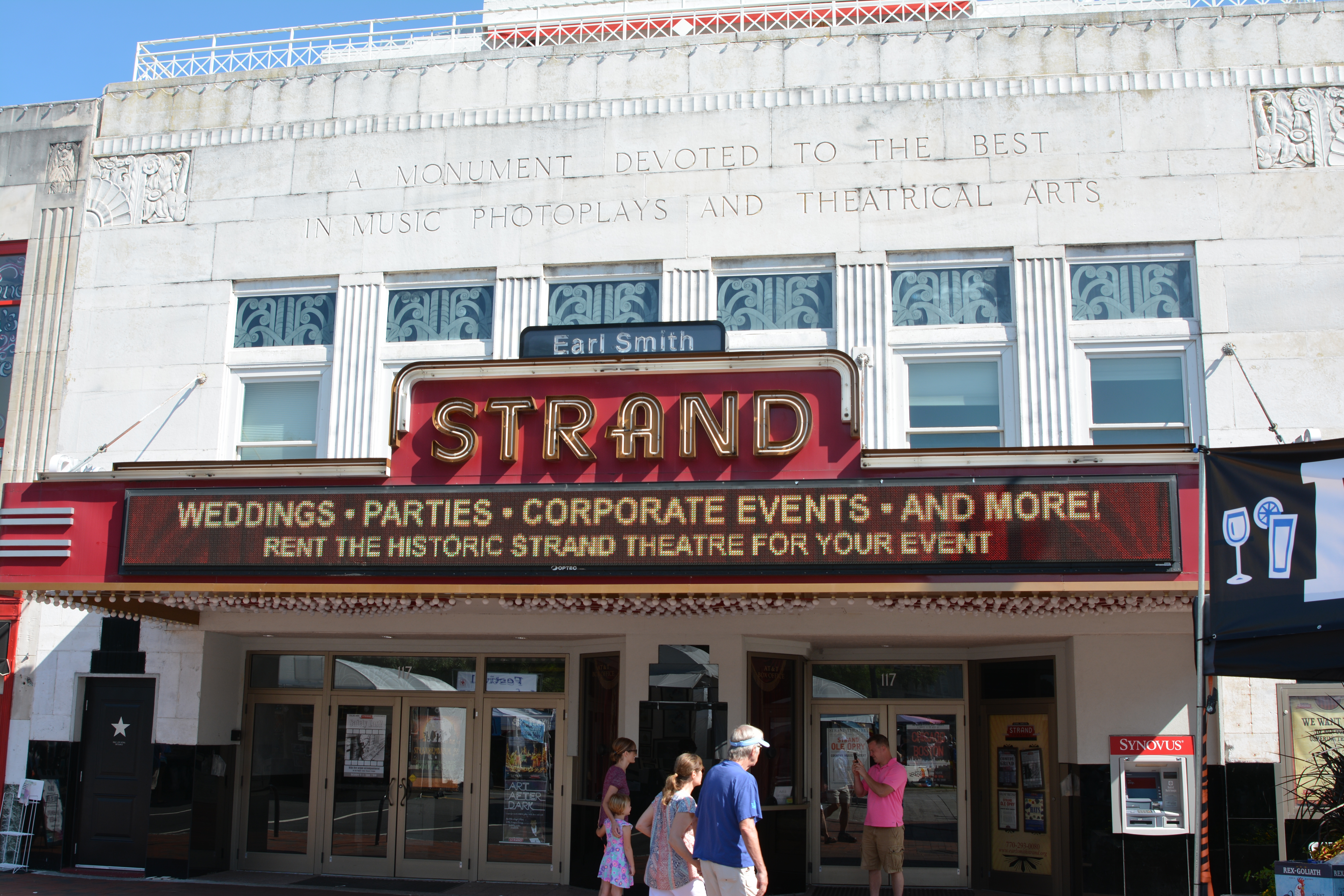
- Front of building
- Interactive map of Strand Theatre
- Full name: Earl and Rachel Smith Strand Theatre
- Address: 117 North Park Square; Marietta, Georgia; United States
- Owner: Philip Goldstein
- Operator: Friends of The Strand, Inc.
- Capacity: 531

Construction
- Opened: September 24, 1935
- Reopened: January 8, 2009
- Years active: 1935-76; 2009-present
- Cost: $150,000 ($3.61 million in 2025 dollars)

Website
- Venue Website

The Strand Theatre is a multi-use performing arts and film center in Marietta, Georgia, United States. Originally built in 1935 by the Manning-Winks Theatre Company as an art deco movie palace, it is currently the home of the Earl and Rachel Smith Strand Theatre, a nonprofit arts organization specializing in live theatre, classic movies, concerts, comedy, and other special events.

The theatre closed in 1976, and was re-opened in 2008 as a result of the efforts of the Friends of The Strand, Inc. On October 17, 2017, Earl Smith announced a donation of $500,000 towards the capital campaign in his late wife's name. The theatre was renamed the Earl and Rachel Smith Strand Theatre in her honor.
