= Broadway Theatre (Mount Pleasant, Michigan) =

Coordinates: 43.361515°N 84.463058°W

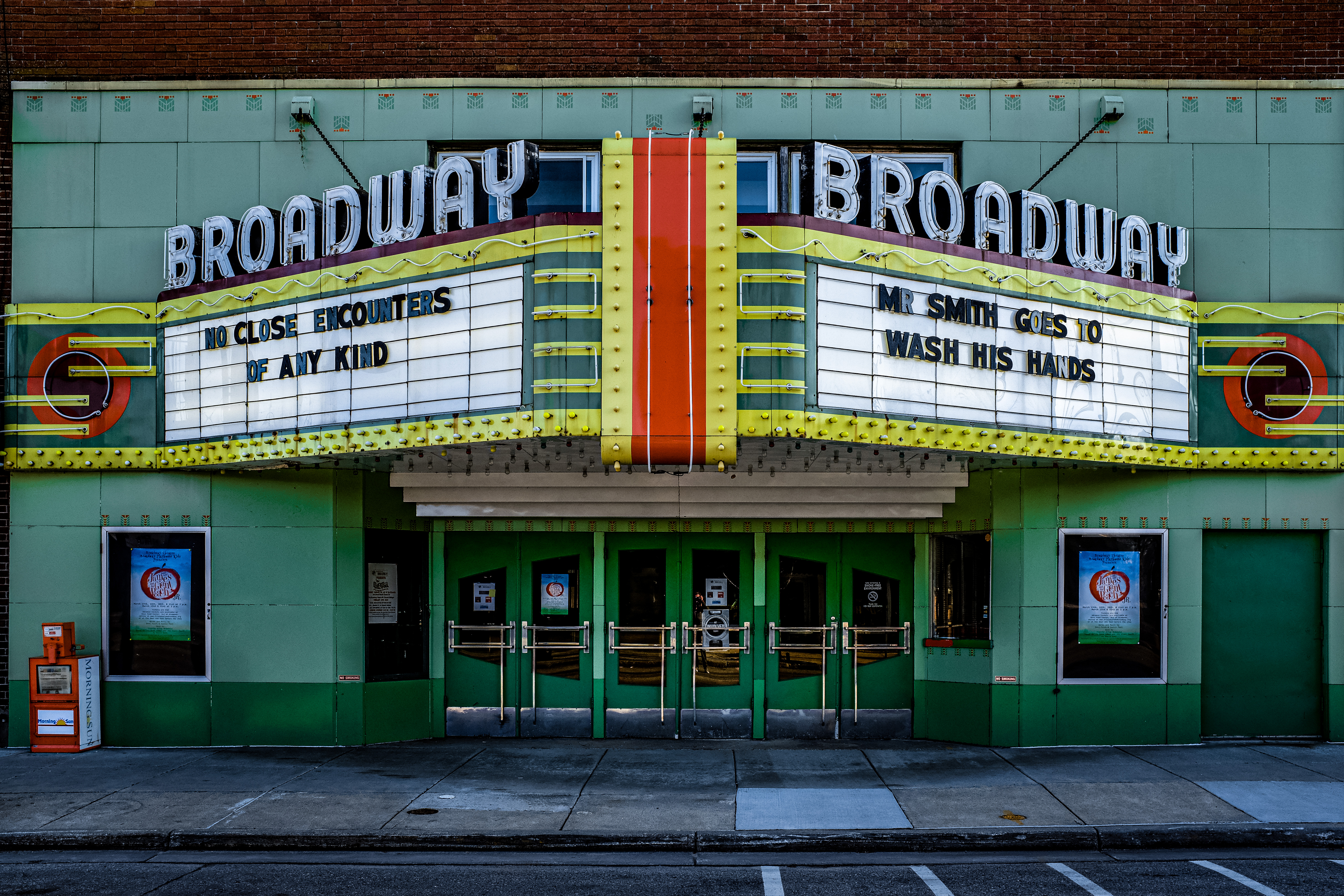
- The Broadway's marquee during the COVID-19 pandemic
- Address: 216 E. Broadway; Mount Pleasant, Michigan; United States
- Opened: 1906

Website
- friendsofthebroadway.org

The Broadway Theatre opened in 1929 in downtown Mount Pleasant, Michigan and features concerts, classic films and the local Community Theater troupe, the Broadway Players. It has 480 seats.

== See also ==
Movie palaces list
