= Alabama Theatre =

Movie theatre in Birmingham, Alabama, US

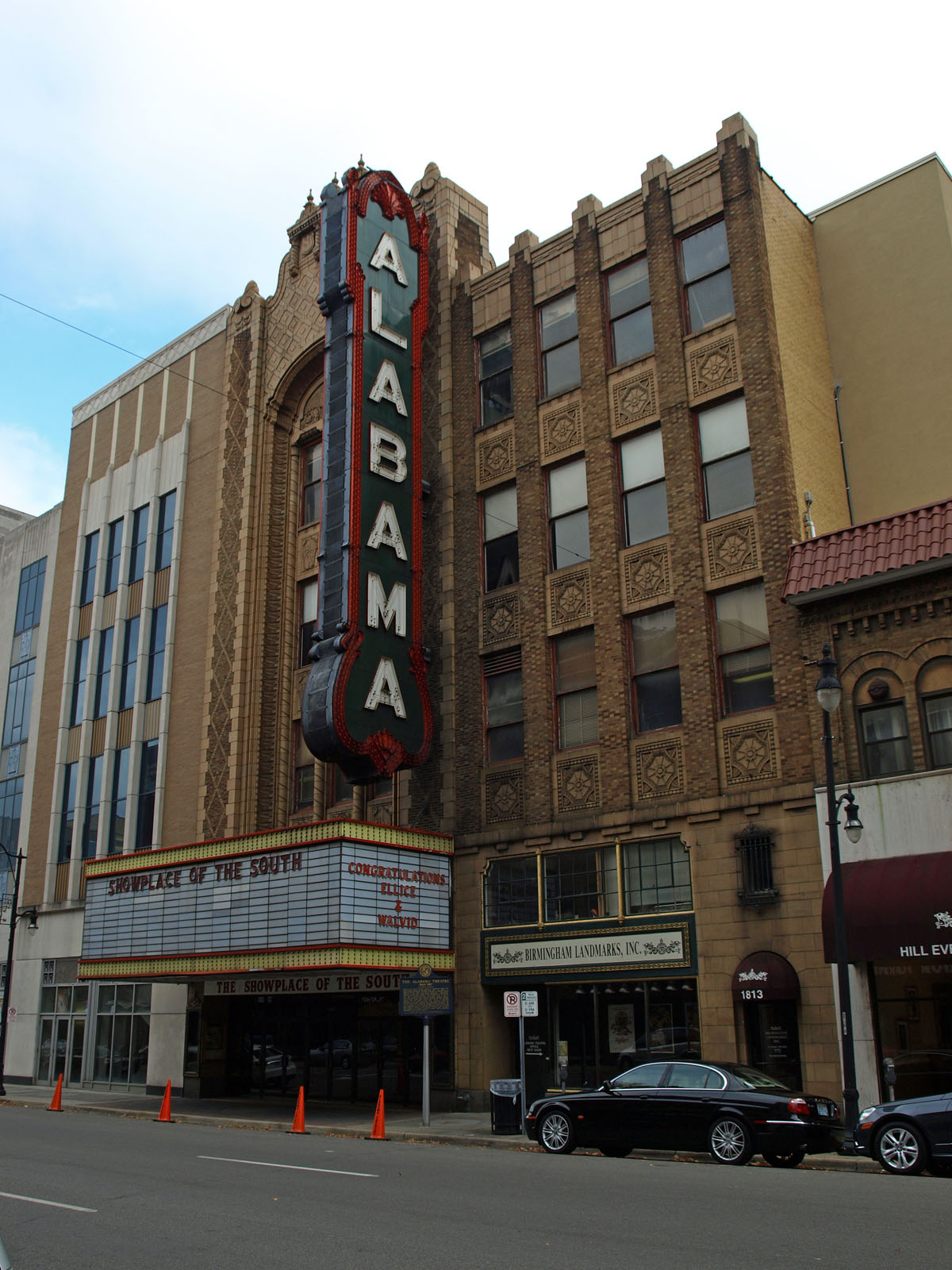
- Interactive map of Alabama Theatre
- Address: 1817 Third Avenue North; Birmingham, Alabama; United States
- Owner: Birmingham Landmarks, Inc.
- Capacity: 2,176
- Type: movie palace
- Current use: Performing arts center

Construction
- Opened: December 26, 1927

Website
- alabamatheatre.com
- Alabama Theatre
- U.S. National Register of Historic Places
- Alabama Register of Landmarks and Heritage
- Coordinates: 33°30′53.69″N 86°48′33.04″W
- Area: 0.4 acres (0.16 ha)
- Architect: Graven & Mayger
- Architectural style: Mission/spanish Revival
- NRHP reference No.: 79000386

Significant dates
- Added to NRHP: November 13, 1979
- Designated ARLH: February 15, 1977

The Alabama Theatre is a movie palace in Birmingham, Alabama, United States. It was built in 1927 by Paramount's Publix Theatres chain as its flagship theater for the southeastern region of the United States. Seating 2,500 people at the time, it was the largest in the Birmingham theater district. The district was once home to many large theaters and movie palaces that featured vaudeville, performing arts, nickelodeons and Hollywood films. Built to show silent films, the Alabama still features its original Wurlitzer theater organ. The Alabama Theatre and Lyric Theatre are the district's only remaining theaters, and as of 2024, both are in operation.

The Alabama and its historic organ were added to the Alabama Register of Landmarks and Heritage on February 15, 1977 and to the National Register of Historic Places on November 13, 1979. The theater has been surveyed by the Historic American Buildings Survey on several occasions, most recently in 1996. It was designated as the state's historic theater in 1993.

== History ==
Construction plans for the Alabama Theatre were announced in 1926, but groundbreaking was delayed until April 1, 1927. The grand opening was held as originally scheduled on December 26, 1927. Construction of the concrete-and-steel building cost approximately $1.5 million.

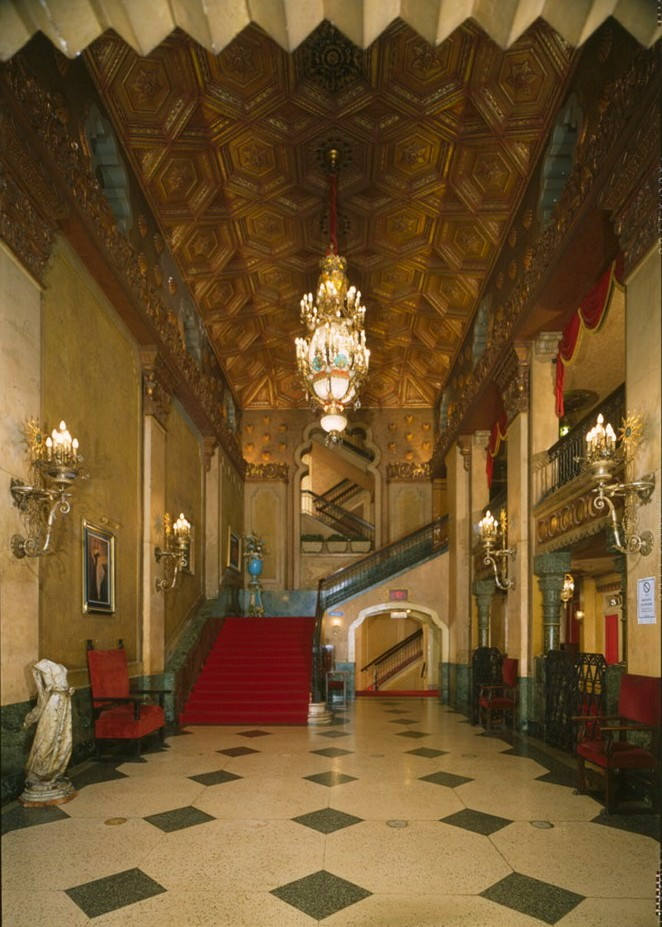
The Grand Lobby, between the Hall of Mirrors and Main Auditorium, in 1996, prior to restoration.

In 1934, the adjacent Loveman's of Alabama department store was destroyed by fire. However, a thick firewall protected the theater and limited the impact to some smoke damage around air vents in the auditorium. The smoke stains would remain until the 1998 theater restoration.

In its early days, the Alabama Theatre hosted weekly Saturday meetings of the local chapter of Mickey Mouse Club, which was formed in 1933. By 1935, the club had more than 7,000 members, making it the world's largest Mickey Mouse Club. Membership eventually peaked at more than 18,000 before the club closed nearly ten years after it had been formed.

The Alabama Theatre hosted the Miss Birmingham pageant from 1935 to 1948 and the Miss Alabama pageant from 1949 until 1966.

The decline of downtown Birmingham through the 1960s and 1970s saw the closing of most of the downtown's movie theatres. In 1981, Plitt Theatres closed the Alabama and sold it to Cobb Theaters of Birmingham. Cobb unsuccessfully attempted to reopen the Alabama several times and eventually sold it to Costa and Head, developers working to revitalize the downtown area. Costa and Head initiated a series of classic films at the Alabama with some success, but ultimately filed for bankruptcy in 1986.

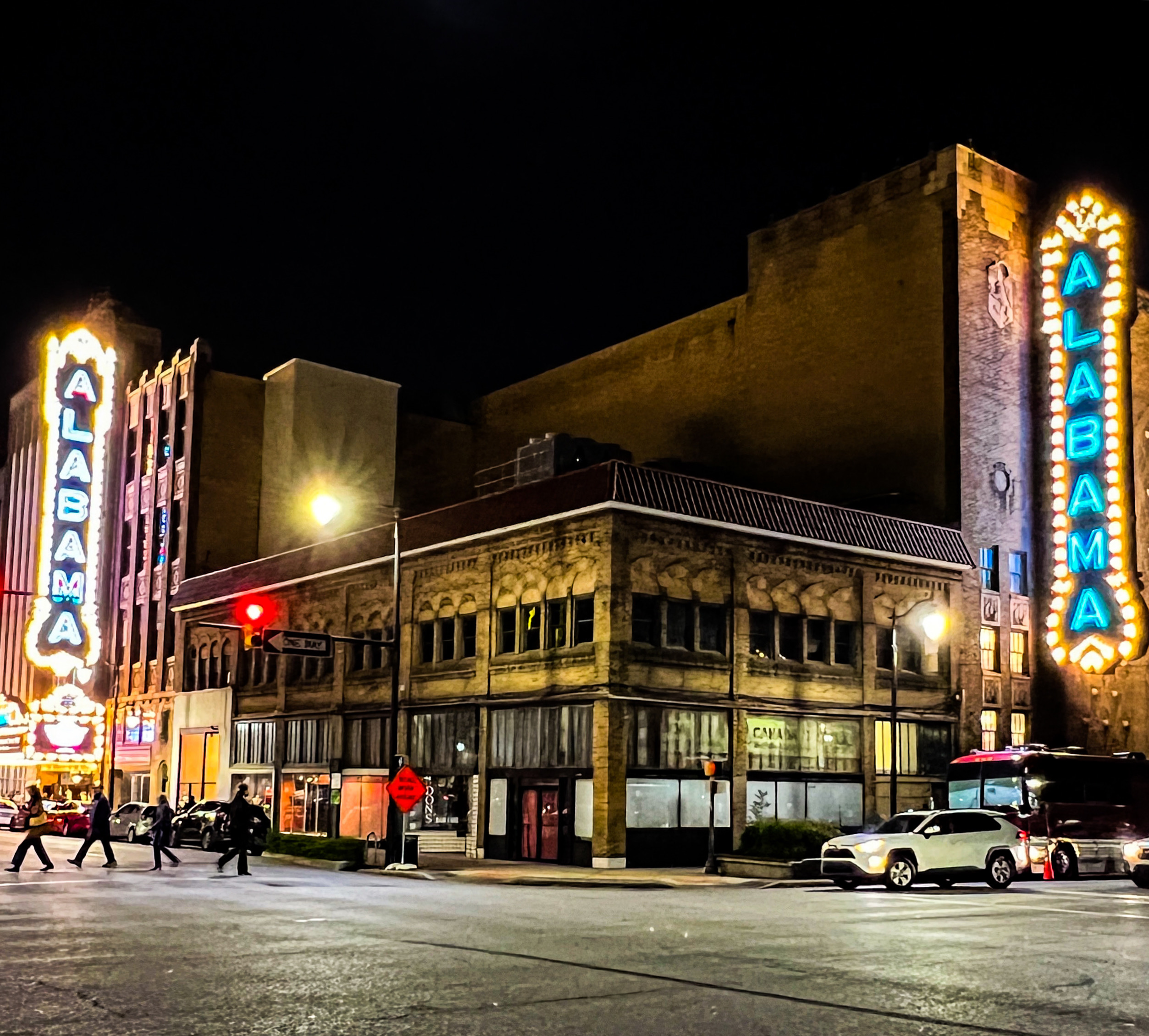
Birmingham, Alabama's famous Alabama Theatre in 2021 showing off its new theatre-side sign (right side of photo).

The Alabama chapter of the American Theatre Organ Society (ATOS) began maintaining the Alabama's organ in the 1970s. The group sought permission to remove the organ from the Alabama in order to save it, but Costa and Head's creditors deemed it the most valuable item in the building and forbade its removal. In response, the group began a fundraising effort to buy the theater, and it was purchased in 1987 by Birmingham Landmarks, Inc., a nonprofit organization originally started with the sole purpose of saving the theater. With the purchase, the theater was renamed the Alabama Theatre for the Performing Arts. In 1993, the Alabama was designated the official state historic theater of the state of Alabama.

In 1998, the Alabama Theatre underwent a complete restoration in which gold leaf and paint were cleaned or replaced, seats were replaced or recovered and some carpeting and drapes were replaced. The renovation coincided with the conversion of the 1935 Loveman's building into the McWane Science Center.

Birmingham Landmarks continues to own the theater. The Alabama hosts approximately 250 events each year, attracting more than 400,000 people to a variety of performances including Broadway-type theatre, ballet, opera, concerts and film.

== Organ ==
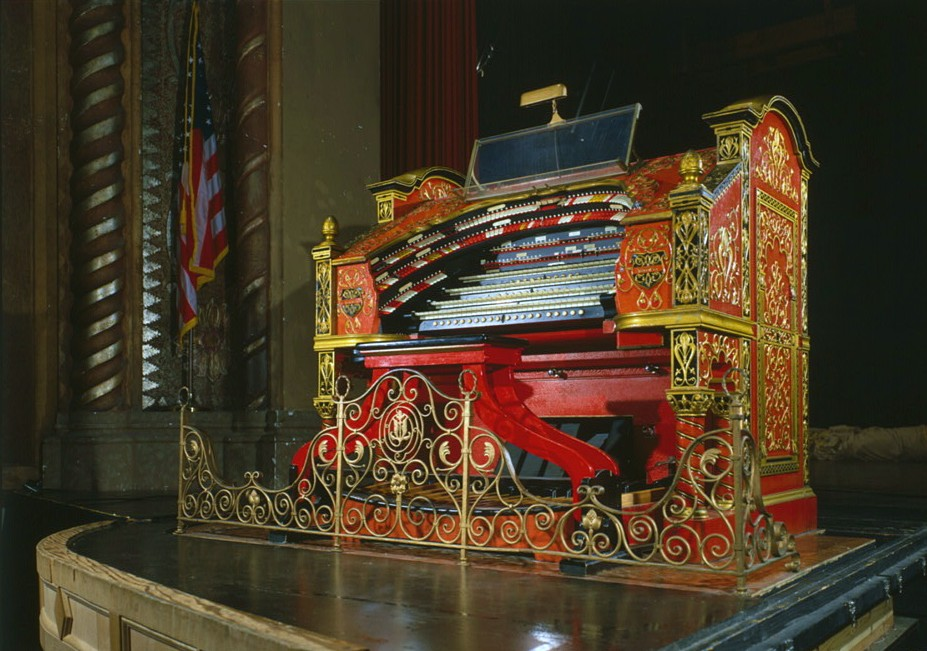
The Wurlitzer theatre organ

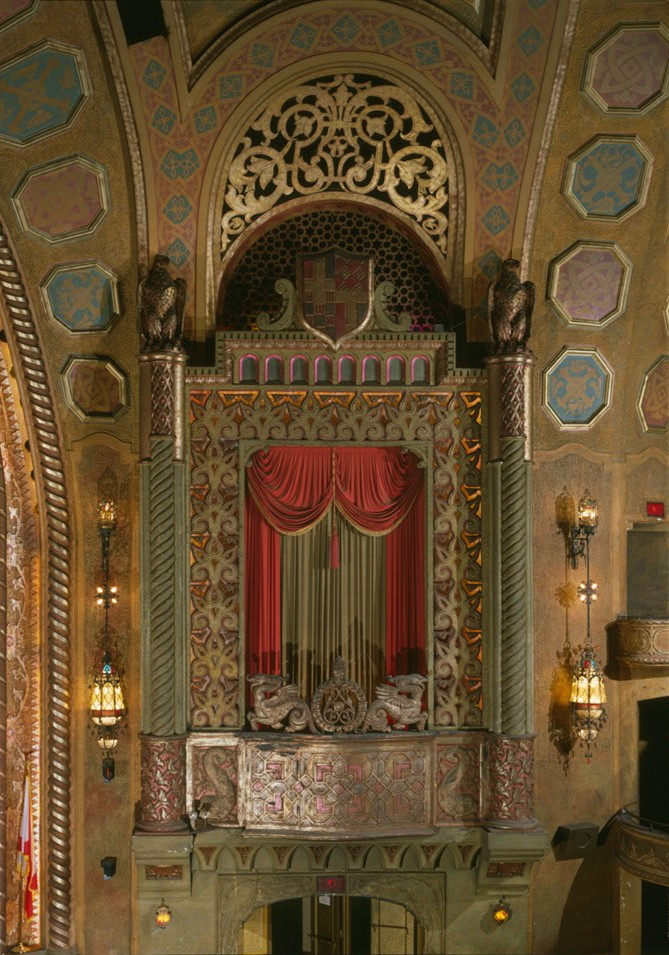
One of the organ screens in 1996

When the Alabama Theatre was built in 1927, films were silent and required musical accompaniment, typically provided by an orchestra or theater pipe organ. The Alabama's organ is a Crawford Special-Publix One Mighty Wurlitzer. Only 17 products of this model were built, and the Alabama's organ, nicknamed Big Bertha, is one of only three still installed at their original sites.

The Alabama's organ is a four-manual keyboard organ. It was originally installed with 20 ranks (sets of pipes) but has been expanded to 32. It also features numerous percussion instruments and sound effects to accompany silent films.

== Lyric Theater (Birmingham, Alabama) ==
Birmingham Landmarks also owns the Lyric Theatre, 1800 3rd Ave North, a 1914 vaudeville theater located across the street from the Alabama, which reopened in 2016 after an $11.5 million restoration.
