= Studio Cinema =

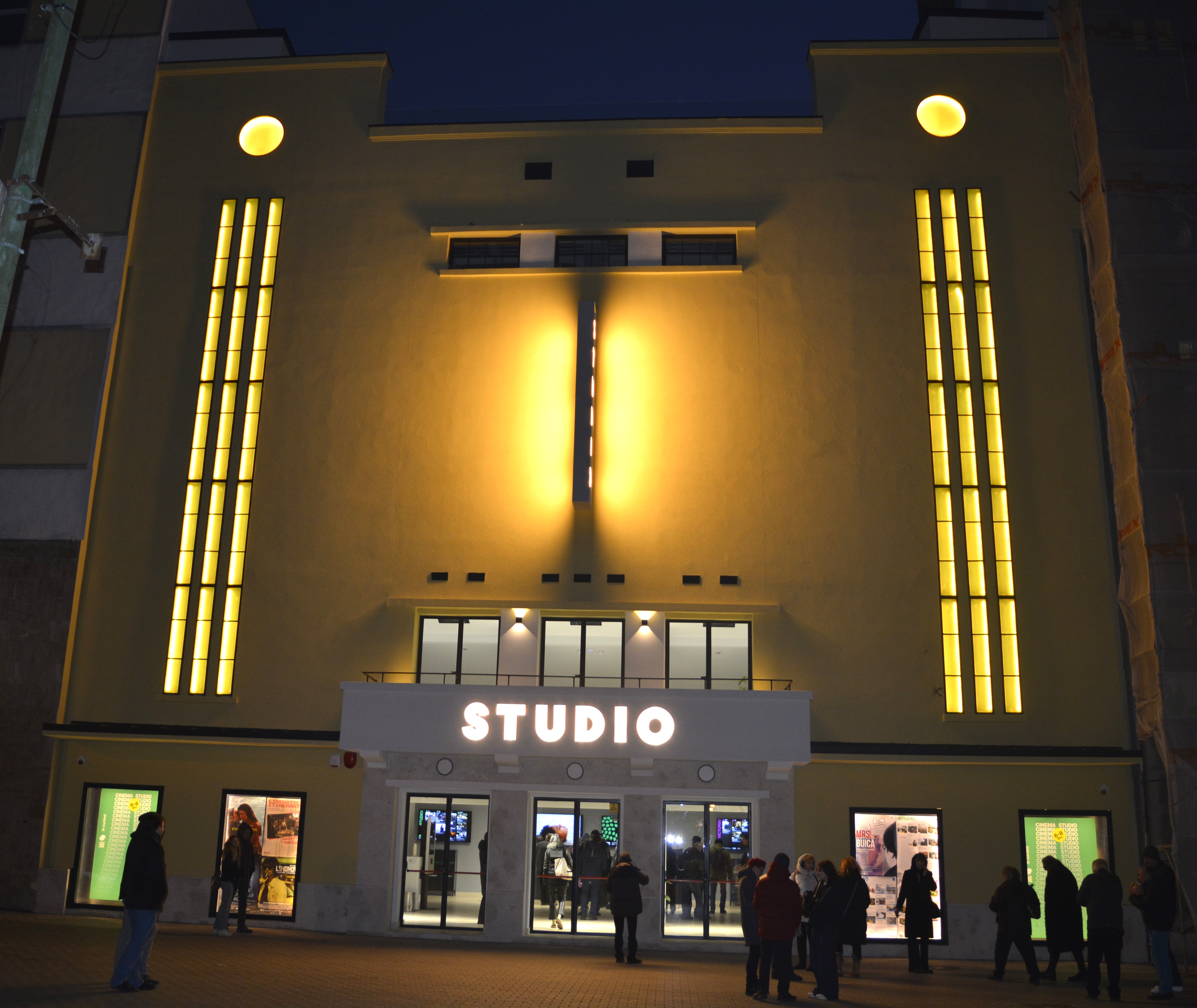
- Interactive map of Studio Cinema
- Former names: Thalia Cinema; Scala Cinema; Timpuri Noi Cinema
- Address: 2 Nikolaus Lenau Street, Timișoara
- Coordinates: 45°45′8″N 21°13′33″E
- Owner: Timișoara City Hall
- Capacity: 344
- Type: Cinema

Construction
- Built: 1938
- Years active: 1938–2011, 2024–present
- Architect: Mihai Dolliner

Website
- cinemastudio-tm.ro

Studio Cinema is a movie palace in the western Romanian city of Timișoara. The cinema building was constructed in 1938 and originally housed the Thalia Cinema, later renamed Scala, and after 1948, Timpuri Noi. It closed in the early 2000s and was reopened in 2024 following extensive renovation work.

== History ==
Originally named Scala Cinema, the Art Deco building was constructed in 1938 by entrepreneur Emil Gonda, based on a design by architect Mihai Dolliner. The structure stands out for its formal simplicity, functional clarity, and the interplay of various textures on its main façade. Notable features include the entrance structure, the trio of vertical niches with colored glass that discreetly conceal drainage pipes, and the porthole-style openings characteristic of modernist architecture.

After the nationalization in 1948, the cinema was renamed "Timpuri Noi" and began operating on a non-stop schedule, exclusively screening documentary films. During that time, there was a period when admission was free. Even after ticket fees were reinstated, the price remained largely symbolic.

While under RADEF administration, the cinema screened both commercial and art films. However, due to a lack of investment, the building fell into severe disrepair and permanently closed in 2011. It was reopened on 6 December 2024, following a rehabilitation and repurposing project led and funded by the city hall—which took ownership of the building in 2018—in partnership with the French Institute in Romania and various local associations.

The cinema includes two indoor screening rooms—one with 200 seats and another with 64—as well as a rooftop open-air garden with seating for 80 people. The attic has been converted into a multifunctional space that hosts an administrative area and a hub focused on film education and local film production. On the ground floor, there is a lobby and reception area featuring a cineshop, a café, and two studios for sound and video editing.
