= Varsity Theatre (Palo Alto) =

Former movie palace in Palo Alto, California, USA

Coordinates: 37.447478°N 122.159306°W

- Fox Varsity Theatre; New Varsity Theatre
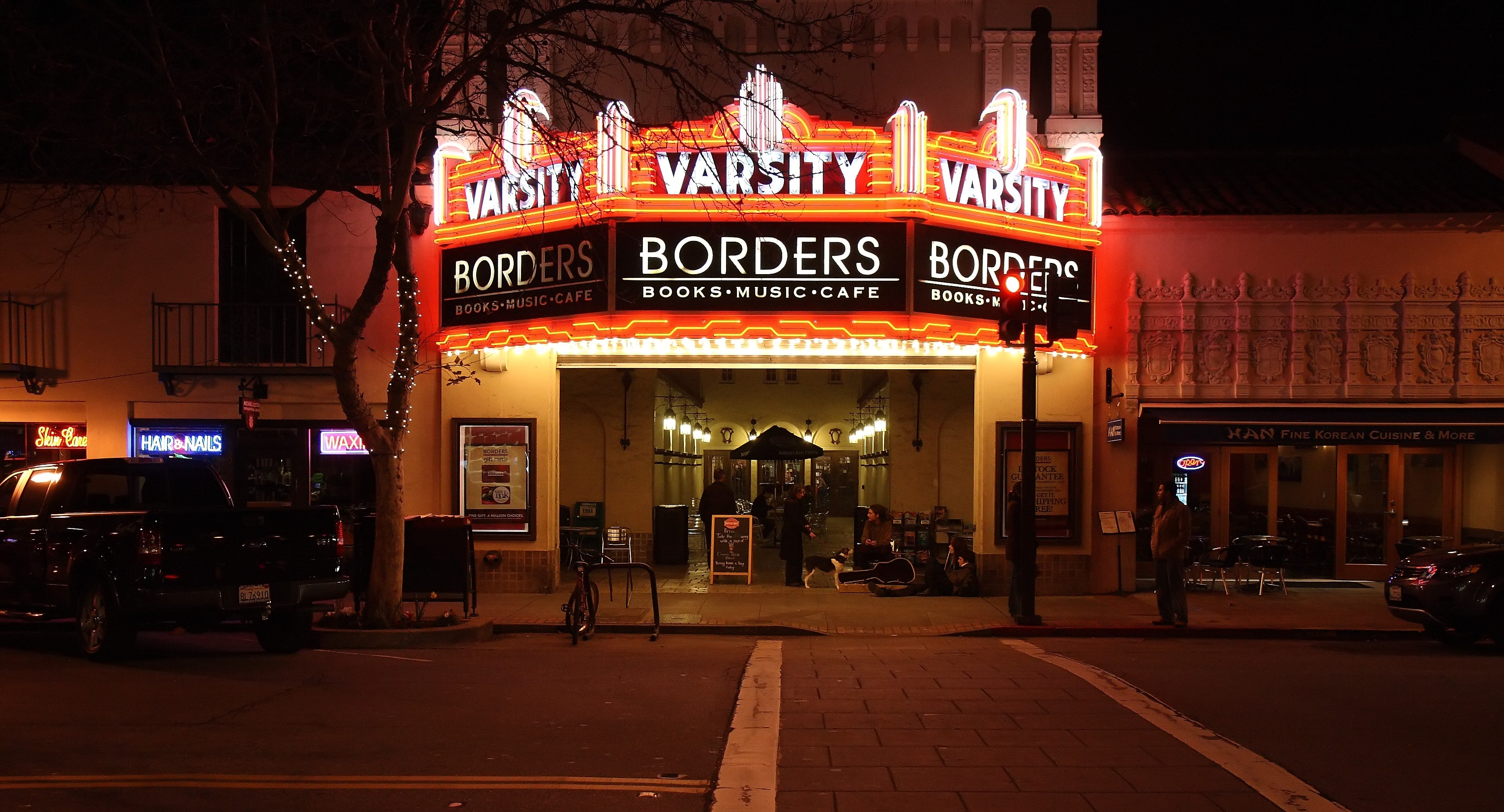
- Marquee in 2010, when the building housed a Borders bookstore
- Interactive map of Varsity Theatre
- Address: 456 University Avenue; Palo Alto, California; United States
- Capacity: 975
- Type: Single-screen movie theater
- Current use: Coffee shop and offices

Construction
- Opened: 1927
- Closed: 1994
- Architects: Reid Brothers: James Reid, Merritt Reid

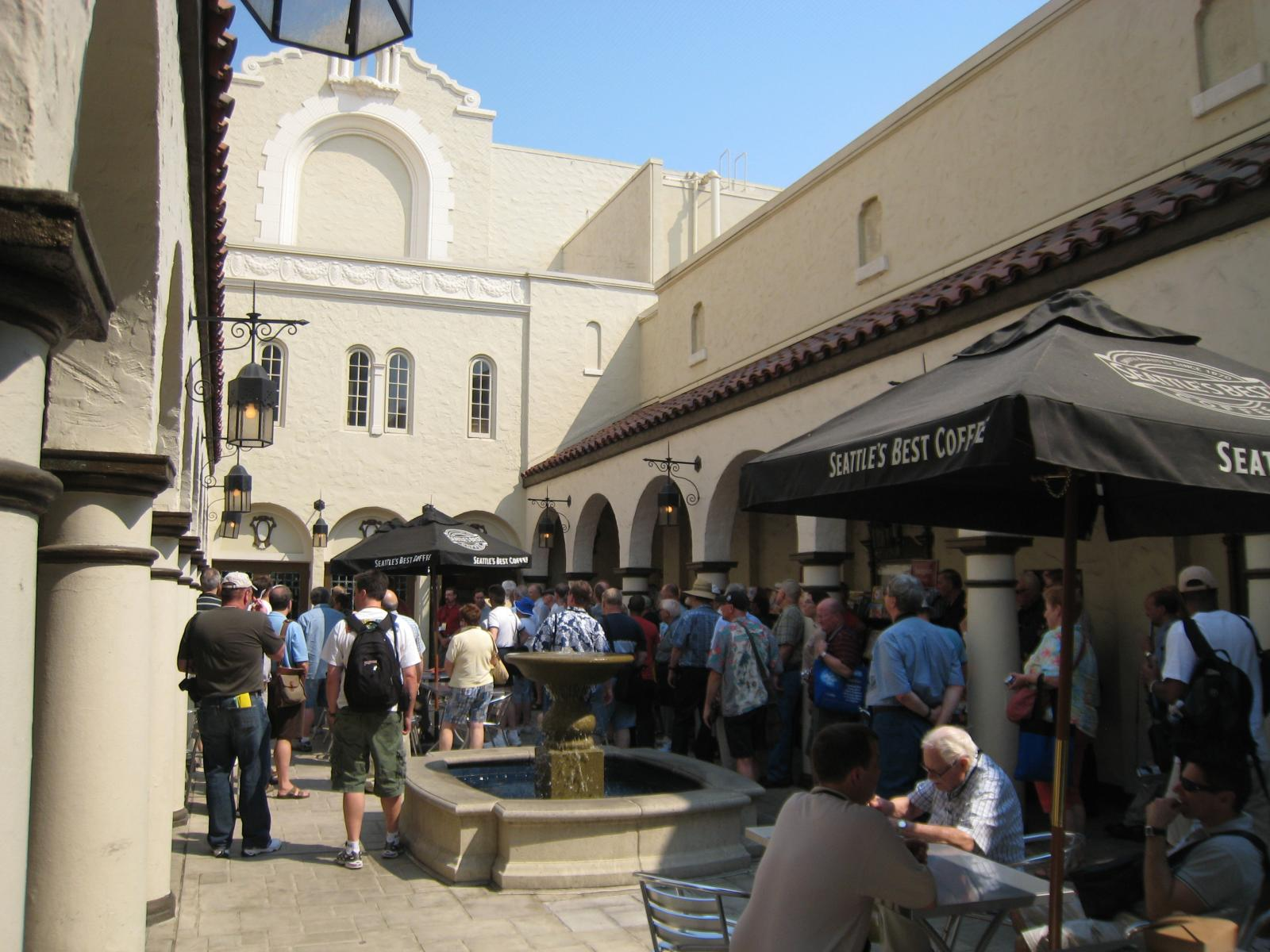
Courtyard in 2008

The Varsity Theatre is a former movie palace on University Avenue in Palo Alto, California. It was designed in a mixed Mission Revival and Spanish Renaissance style by brothers James Reid and Merritt Reid and opened in 1927. The theater closed in 1994 and the building has been adapted for other commercial uses, initially as a Borders bookstore and since 2015 housing a co-working space and a Blue Bottle cafe.

== History ==
The original Varsity Theatre had opened in 1911 on the other side of University Avenue. Reid & Reid were commissioned to design a new building at 456 University Avenue. Known for the Hotel del Coronado in Southern California, they designed a movie palace in a combination of Mission Revival and Spanish Renaissance styles with a distinctive neon marquee and an elongated, colonnade-lined courtyard. The reported cost was $250,000. It opened on September 26, 1927, showing Rose of the Golden West. It was part of Peninsula Theatres Corporation, a subsidiary of the West Coast Theatres chain, which was later merged into Fox Theatres, and was also known as the Fox Varsity Theatre.

University Avenue had several movie theaters; in the 1970s the Varsity became a revival house and also a live music venue, and housed a restaurant in the courtyard. It was operated by Landmark Theatres from 1987 to 1994, when it closed for financial reasons. It had been one of three movie theaters in the San Francisco Bay Area still showing The Rocky Horror Picture Show.

Despite protests from locals and also the San Francisco Chronicle, which compared the theater to the Louvre, the owner, Charles "Chop" Keenan, was granted a zoning variance to increase square footage to offset the cost of seismic retrofitting in order to convert the Varsity into a Borders bookstore. Original plans to gut the building were modified to conform to federal regulations for historic buildings, and much of the interior was preserved in addition to the exterior appearance of the theater.

Borders was liquidated in 2011. The building remained vacant until 2015, when it was renovated by Gensler to accommodate HanaHaus, a co-working space operated by the software company SAP, and a Blue Bottle cafe. HanaHaus occupies the former auditorium, where the stage was retained and until the COVID-19 pandemic was available for conference rental. The closure of both HanaHaus and Blue Bottle was announced in September 2024.
