= Alhambra Theatre (San Francisco) =

Theater in California, USA

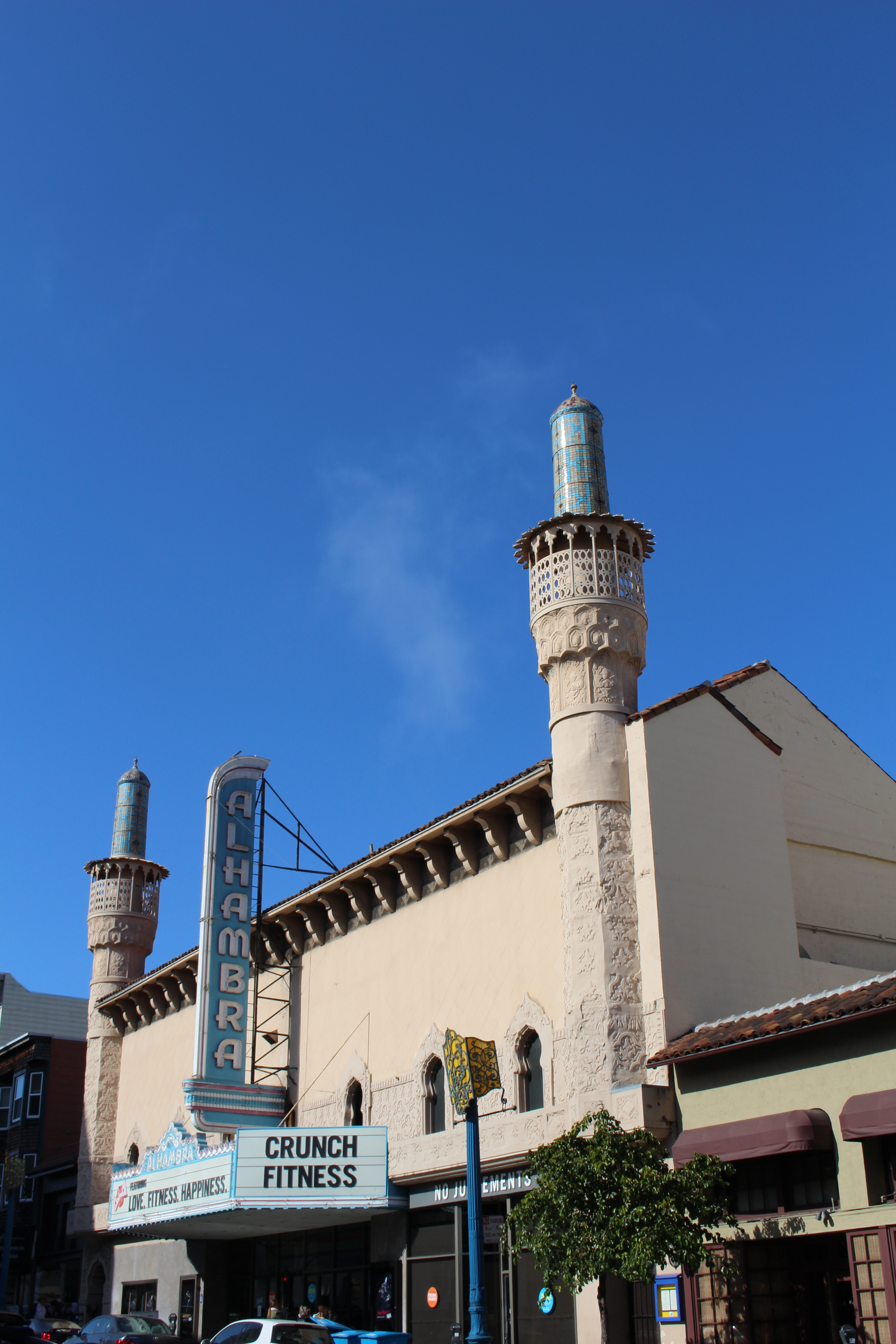
- The building in 2014

- Location within San Francisco County Location within California Location within the United States
- Address: 2330 Polk Street; San Francisco
- Coordinates: 37.79831°N 122.4221°W
- Capacity: 1,625
- Current use: Fitness club

Construction
- Opened: November 5, 1926
- Closed: February 22, 1998
- Architect: Timothy L. Pflueger

Tenant
- Crunch Fitness

San Francisco Designated Landmark
- Designated: 1996
- Reference no.: 217

The Alhambra Theatre was a Moorish Revival movie palace at 2330 Polk Street in San Francisco, California, that opened on November 5, 1926. The building was designated a San Francisco landmark in 1996 and currently hosts a Crunch Fitness gym, still showing films on the big screen.

== History ==
The theater was designed by Miller & Pflueger (architect Timothy L. Pflueger also designed the Castro Theater and the Paramount Theater in Oakland, California).

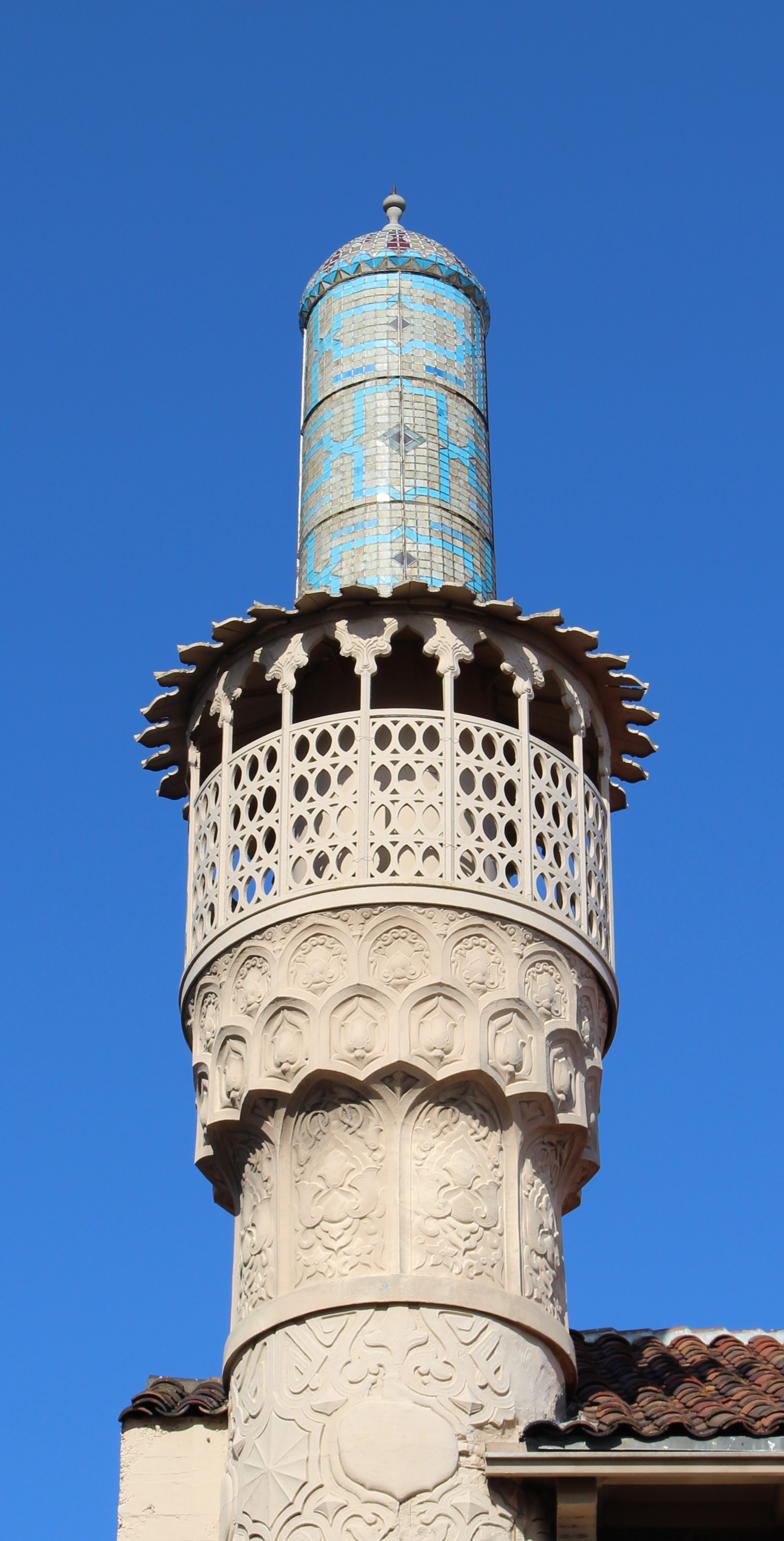
North tower

The Alhambra Theatre once had 1,625 seats when it opened – on November 5, 1926 – and it cost $500,000. In 1930, the theater survived a bombing attempt, as the bomb was discovered and removed before it could go off.

It was later converted to twin theaters in 1976. It reopened as a single screen in 1988 and finally closed as a movie theater on February 22, 1998. It was designated official San Francisco landmark #217 on February 21, 1996.

The building is now occupied by Crunch Fitness. The conversion to the gym has retained most of the interior detail, and movies are shown on the still-present big screen. The balcony retains the aisles, which have been widened, although there are only four. They accommodate about 80 cardio machines facing the screen.

== Design ==
The Alhambra Theater was built with reinforced concrete and unprotected steel trusses. The theater is in the Moorish Revival Style, with its ornamental detailing inspired by Mexican and Spanish sources. A restored original marquee still exists post-gym conversion.

The external has two twin turrets and was designed to resemble a Moorish castle. The interior features intricate art deco design including a kaleidoscope domed ceiling.
