= Plaza cinema, Port Talbot =

Cinema in Port Talbot, Wales

Coordinates: 51.5918°N 3.7791°W

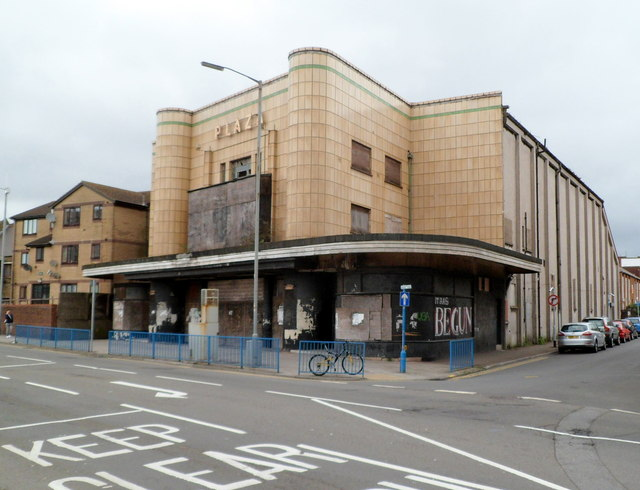
The Plaza

The Plaza is a former cinema in Port Talbot, Wales, UK. Built in 1939, it is listed for protection as Grade II. The building was refurbished and converted into a community centre in 2021/2022.

== History ==
The cinema was built in 1939 and opened in April 1940. It initially closed as a cinema in 1983 with the film Tootsie when it was converted into a bingo club. It re-opened again as a cinema on 18 October 1985 with Walt Disney's Peter Pan. It finally closed on 4 January 1999 after several multiplex cinemas had opened around the venue, starving the cinema of "first run" new release film product.

The cinema was listed Grade II on 4 August 1999 because it was considered a very rare example in Wales of 1930s cinema architecture, with an interior which was largely intact.

It was purchased by the local authority in 2009, but by 2019 the building was derelict, and a campaign was launched to save it and turn it over for community use.

=== Conversion ===
In March 2021 Neath Port Talbot County Borough Council announced that £3.6 million had been set aside to convert the space to include a café and gym, office space, conference area, recording studio, and shops. By November 2021 work on the refurbishment of the cinema and its reopening as a community hub were under way.

== Building ==
The building has a modern design with Art Deco influences.
