= Capitol Theatre (Rome, New York) =

Theater in Rome, New York

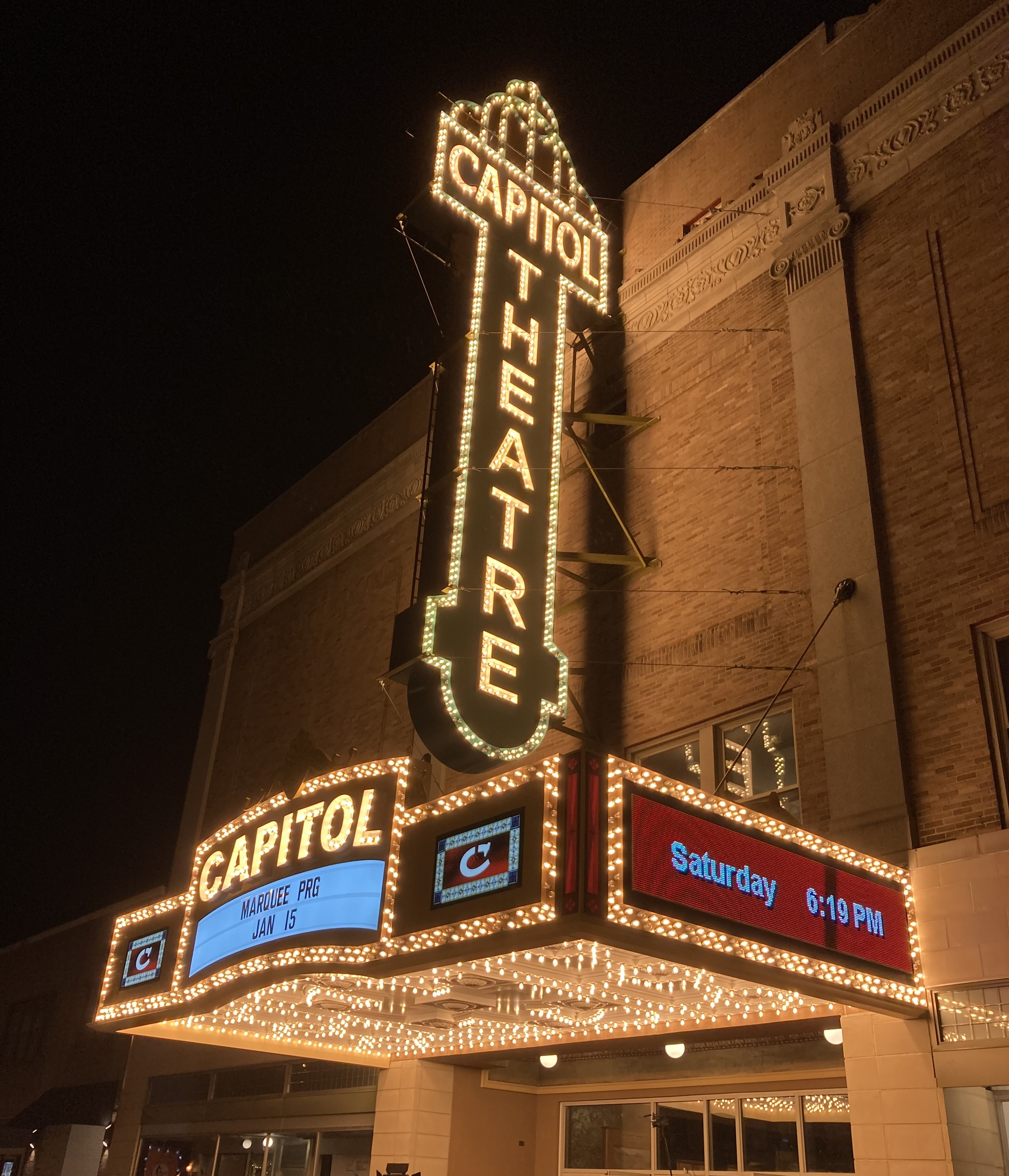
- The Marquee located at the front of the Theatre on January 15, 2022.
- Interactive map of Capitol Theatre
- Address: 220 West Dominick Street, Rome, NY 13440
- Location: Rome, New York
- Coordinates: 43.212077°N 75.460112°W
- Capacity: 1,788
- Type: Theatre

Construction
- Opened: December 10, 1928

Website
- www.romecapitol.com

The Capitol Theatre is a theatre operating in Rome, New York. It opened December 10, 1928 as part of the Kallet chain of movie houses, presenting first run films until it closed in 1974. After extensive renovation, the theatre re-opened in 1985 as the non-profit Capitol Civic Center, offering classic films, live theatrical performances, and concerts.

== History ==
Early movie theaters in Rome in the 20th century consisted of nickelodeons: the Idle Hour, the Casino and the Romohawk, which were located downtown. The larger Carroll was built in 1911, followed by the Star in 1914.

In 1910 brothers Myron J. and J.S. Kallet of Syracuse rented their first store in the Onondaga Valley to operate as a nickelodeon. They began to build an empire. By 1920 they formed the Carroll Theater Amusement Company and purchased the Carroll, renaming it as the Strand, their first theater in Rome. In the few years following, the Kallets bought the Star and the 1907 Lyric. It had been showing films intermittently mixed with live programming under various names: the Lyric, followed by the Family, Regent, and finally renamed the Family again.

In 1925, the Kallets were expanding their operations to purchase theaters in cities other than Rome and Oneida; they changed the name of their corporation to Kallet Theaters, Inc. The following year, they made an alliance with the M. E. Commerford Amusement Company of Scranton, Pennsylvania, gaining the booking facilities of the Commerford company and its subsidiary, Amalgamated-Vaudeville.

First announced on December 30, 1926, the deal for the new, then-unnamed Kallet theater was closed on March 21, 1927. The property for the new theater on West Dominick street was sold to the Kallets and Commerford Companies by the owner, John R. Harper. The property comprised 100 feet frontage on West Dominick street, including numbers 212 to 224, and 200 feet depth to West Willett street. The lot was previously owned by the Hager and Beck families of Rome, who sold the lot to Harper for his business.

Initial details of the newly named Capitol Theatre were announced in August 1927. Leon H. Lempert Jr. of Rochester, New York, was commissioned to do the design. His father had designed the Washington Street Opera House in Rome. At an estimated cost of $500,000 to build, initial specifications called for four store-fronts, a second floor of offices, and a third floor of apartments. The auditorium was designed to seat 2,500, and would show both silent and the new talking pictures, as well as "anything that can be seen on Broadway."

The five buildings on the site of the theater were razed in the winter of 1927. Excavation of the site was started on April 17, 1928 by B.S. McCarey of Rome. Construction of the theater was under the auspices of the construction firm of Stofflet & Tillotson, Philadelphia.

Although the apartments were not in the final construction, and the number of store-fronts was reduced to two instead of four, the auditorium design remained largely intact. In the auditorium, seating came to approximately 2,000 seats. Spanish-Moroccan plasterwork was incorporated into the theater's design, and colors of gold, green, blue, and browns were dominant in the lobby, foyer and auditorium's paint scheme. A marquee and vertical blade over the entrance greeted patrons, flanked with 2,000 incandescent bulbs. A heating system was installed under the stage and an air ventilation system in the roof.

Installed in the Capitol's orchestra pit was a 3/7 Möller, Style-70 Theatre Organ. Originally planned to be on the left-hand side of the orchestra pit, the console was placed in the center of the orchestra pit on a lift.

The Capitol's projection booth was ready on December 7, when it was tested. It contained two projectors with both Vitaphone and Movietone equipment for talking pictures. A third, auxiliary projector was silent only. The two spotlights and one slide projector made by the Chicago Equipment Company and installed in the booth are still there in the 21st century.

The Capitol opened on Monday, December 10, 1928. More than fifty people lined up in the cold an hour before the box office opened at 5:30 PM to be sure to get a ticket. Accompaniment on the organ was by Robert S. Bancroft. The opening night program consisted of Mrs. Arthur Seth Evans singing "The Star-Spangled Banner" while a slide-show of the lyrics were projected on the curtains. The six Capitol pages were introduced on the stage, and the dedication of the theater by the management followed.

Following the dedication was the film show of a newsreel accompanied by Mr. Bancroft, and two Vitaphone shorts—"The Lash" and "Those Pullman Porters". Bancroft gave a short recital at the organ, "playing a medley of popular airs." The feature film was Lilac Time, starring Colleen Moore and Gary Cooper. It had a Movietone soundtrack of music and sound effects.

Although equipped for live acts, the Capitol operated primarily as a movie house for the next 46 years. Occasional touring groups were accommodated on the stage, however, including Art Kahn's Orchestra, and Paul Whiteman's Rhythm Boys (including Bing Crosby) with the California Ramblers, both in 1929. For a few years in the 1930s, Paramount and RKO unit vaudeville were added to film shows two or three times per week. In the 1940s and 1950s, some big bands toured at the Capitol, including Paul Whiteman and Tommy Dorsey.

In 1939, the Capitol received an Art Deco facelift. New lighting fixtures, wall tapestry, carpeting, seating, and painting complemented the original Spanish-Moorish architecture. In addition, a new marquee was erected over the old framework, and the blade sign was removed.

Because of changing tastes and competition from television, movie audiences declined. The Capitol closed in 1974; the last film shown first run was The Exorcist. Leased around the same time by Cinema National, Inc., the theater remained shuttered until 1985. At that time it was purchased, renovated and re-opened as the Capitol Civic Center, Inc., a theatre for the performing arts.

== Capitol Civic Center ==
Among the various live and film shows throughout the year, the theatre hosts an annual silent film and early talkie festival, Capitolfest, which has been held annually since 2003. Films at the Capitol are shown from 35mm prints on the theatre's carbon-arc, variable-speed movie projectors.

The theatre seats up to 1,788 people, including the balcony, mezzanine, house, and orchestra areas.

=== Restoration projects ===
Still in place is the theatre's original historic 3-manual, 10-rank Möller theatre organ. Restoration of the organ to working condition started in 2002, when three ranks were added. Since then it has been used on a regular basis, providing dramatic effects when accompanying silent movies. This organ is maintained by the Rome Grand Theatre Organ Society, a chapter of the American Theatre Organ Society.

Restoration efforts by the Capitol Theatre are ongoing; the multi-year restoration will begin with an $800,000 marquee and blade installation, with efforts continuing to eventually restore the interior of the Capitol to its appearance in 1939. The newly restored 1939 ticket booth was installed in front of the theatre in December 2009.

The theater underwent further renovations in 2021, including installing a marquee. On January 15, 2022, the city celebrated the return of the marquee with a lighting, where hundreds gathered to watch. The last marquee was removed in 1977.
