= Kallet =

Kallet is a surname. Notable people with the surname include:

- Arthur Kallet (1902–1972), American consumer advocate
- Cindy Kallet, American folk singer
