= Pine Mountain =

Pine Mountain may refer to:

== Natural formations ==
=== Australia ===
- Pine Mountain (Victoria), large monolith located in Burrowa-Pine Mountain National Park

=== United States ===
- Pine Mountain Wilderness, a protected wilderness area in Prescott National Forest in Arizona, United States
- Pine Mountain (San Bernardino County, California), in San Gabriel Mountains
- Pine Mountain Ridge (California), ridge in the Los Padres National Forest between the Topatopa Mountains and the San Emigdio Mountains, United States
- Pine Mountain Reserve (Connecticut), a reserve in Ridgefield, Connecticut
- Pine Mountain Range, Georgia, United States
- Pine Mountain (Bartow County, Georgia), United States
- Pine Mountain (Cobb County, Georgia), United States
- Pine Mountain (Appalachian Mountains), a ridge running through Kentucky, Virginia, and Tennessee, United States
- Pine Mountain (Taconic Mountains), a mountain in western Massachusetts, United States
- Pine Mountain (Missouri), United States
- Pine Mountain (New York) (disambiguation), several elevations, United States
- Pine Mountain (Oregon), United States
- Pine Mountain (Grayson County, Virginia), United States

== Populated places ==
=== Australia ===
- Pine Mountain, Queensland, a locality in the City of Ipswich

=== United States ===
- Pine Mountain Club, California, a populated place, United States
- Pine Mountain, Harris County, Georgia, a town in Harris and Meriwether counties
- Pine Mountain, Rabun County, Georgia, an unincorporated community
- Pine Mountain Valley, Georgia, an unincorporated community in Harris County
- Pine Mountain, Kentucky, United States

== See also ==
- Pine Mountain Observatory in Oregon, U.S.
- Pine Mountain Music Festival in Michigan, U.S.
- Pine Mountain Ski Jump, Iron Mountain, Michigan, U.S.
- Pine Mountain State Resort Park, Kentucky, U.S.
- Pine Mountain, a brand of firelog made by Jarden Home brands
