= Pine Mountain, Georgia (disambiguation) =

Pine Mountain is a town in Harris and Meriwether counties in the U.S. state of Georgia.

Pine Mountain, Georgia may also refer to:

- Pine Mountain, Rabun County, Georgia, an unincorporated community
- Pine Mountain Range, a long ridge in Harris, Meriwether, and Talbot counties
- Pine Mountain Valley, Georgia, an unincorporated community in Harris County
- Pine Mountain (Bartow County, Georgia), a mountain in Cartersville, Georgia
- Pine Mountain (Cobb County, Georgia), a small summit associated with the American Civil War
