= Georgia State Route 190 =

State highway in Georgia, United States

State Route 190
- Georgia State Route 190 highlighted in red

Route information
- Maintained by GDOT
- Length: 16.7 mi (26.9 km)

Major junctions
- West end: US 27 / SR 1 south of Pine Mountain
- US 27 Alt. / SR 85 Alt. in Little White House Historic Site
- East end: SR 41 / SR 85 in Manchester

Location
- Country: United States
- State: Georgia
- Counties: Harris, Meriwether, Talbot

Highway system
- Georgia State Highway System; Interstate; US; State; Special
← SR 189	→ SR 191

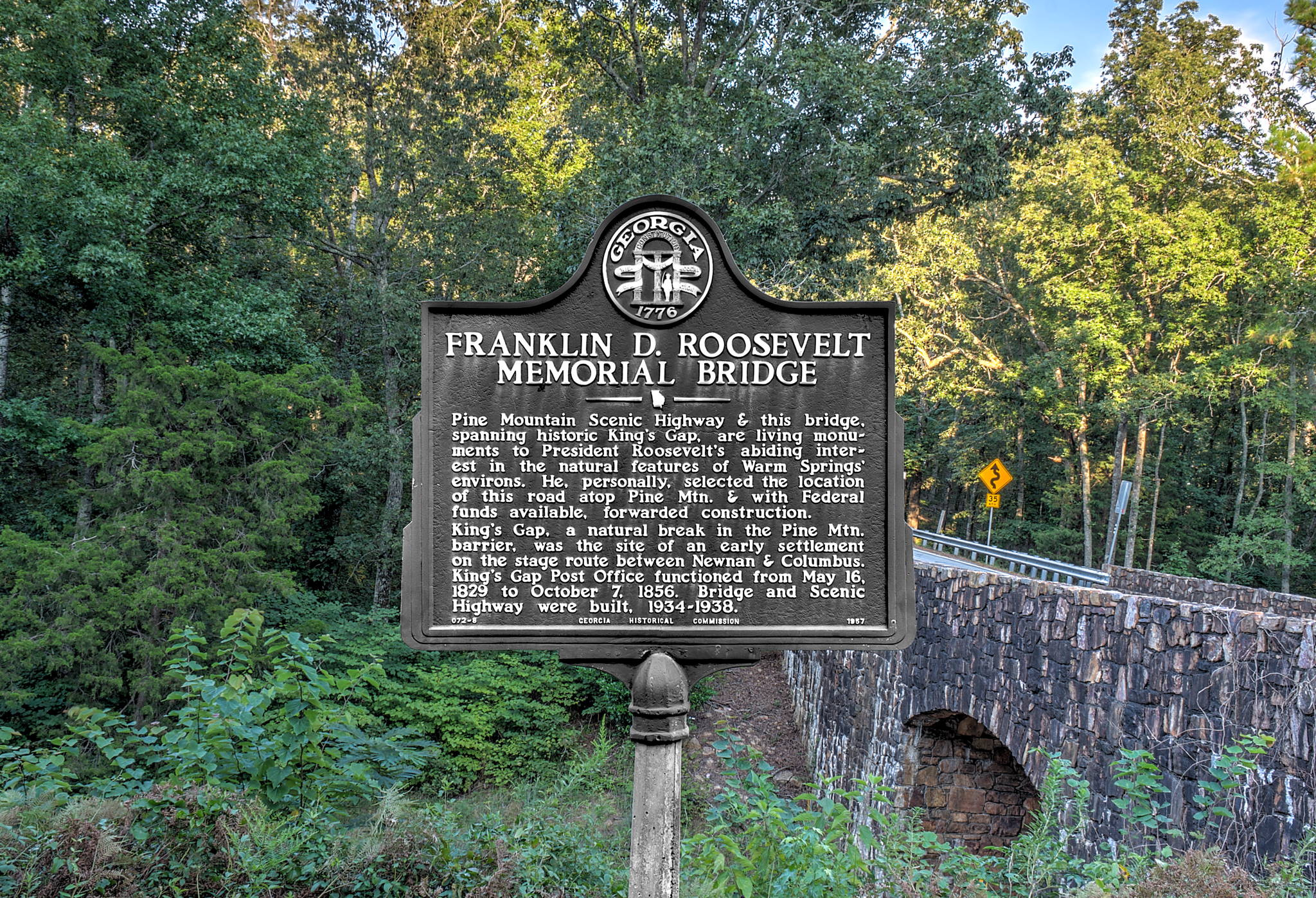
Franklin D. Roosevelt Memorial Bridge

State Route 190 (SR 190) is a 16.7-mile-long (26.9 km) state highway that runs west–east mostly through F. D. Roosevelt State Park and Roosevelt's Little White House Historic Site. It is known as Scenic Heights Road and Pine Mountain Highway. It connects the Pine Mountain area and Manchester. It parallels the Pine Mountain Range for much of its length.

== Route description ==
SR 190 begins at an intersection with US 27/SR 1, south of Pine Mountain, in Harris County. It heads northeast and meets SR 354 within F.D. Roosevelt State Park. After leaving the park, it enters Meriwether County and Roosevelt's Little White House Historic Site, just north of Dowdell's Knob. On the southeast edge of the site, it intersects US 27 Alt./SR 85 Alt. (Whitehouse Highway). It enters Talbot County and parallels the northwestern border of the county. Finally, it crosses back into Meriwether County and enters Manchester. It heads northeast until it meets its eastern terminus, an intersection with SR 41/SR 85 (Broad Street).

SR 190 is not part of the National Highway System, a system of roadways important to the nation's economy, defense, and mobility.

At its eastern terminus lies Georgia State Patrol's Post 34, also known as the Manchester Post. SR 190 is used to access several broadcast towers including WFDR-FM, WFDR (AM), and WVFJ-FM. On top of the mountain, SR 190 passes over State Route 354 on a historic bridge built by the Civilian Conservation Corps. This route also contains many lookout points for photography.

Until the mid-1980s, SR 190 ran through Manchester eastwards to Chalybeate Springs, Georgia with a planned extension of the highway across the Flint River to an eastern terminus at U.S. 19 north of Thomaston, GA. Eventually, the state dropped those plans, and the planned extension was dropped from state maps by 1986. At that same time, the eastern terminus of SR 190 was placed at its present location.

== Major intersections ==
County	Location	mi	km	Destinations	Notes
Harris		0.0	0.0	US 27 / SR 1 – Columbus, LaGrange	Western terminus
Harris		3.4	5.5	SR 354 – Hamilton, Pine Mountain	
Meriwether	Roosevelt's Little White House Historic Site	11.8	19.0	US 27 Alt. / SR 85 Alt. (Whitehouse Highway) – Columbus, Greenville	
Talbot	No major junctions				
Meriwether	Manchester	16.7	26.9	SR 41 / SR 85 (Broad Street) – Columbus, Woodbury	Eastern terminus
1.000 mi = 1.609 km; 1.000 km = 0.621 mi
