= Ralph W. Moss (politician) =

American politician

Ralph Moss
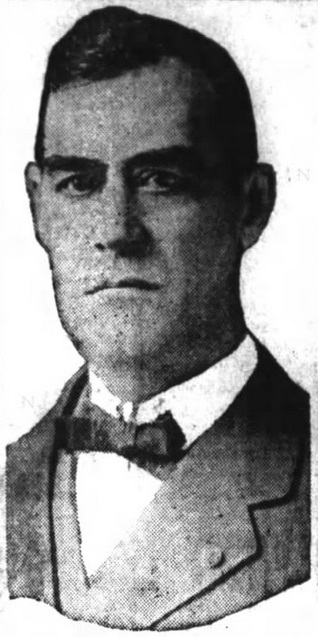

Member of the U.S. House of Representatives from Indiana's 5th district
- In office March 4, 1909 – March 3, 1917
- Preceded by: Elias S. Holliday
- Succeeded by: Everett Sanders

Member of the Indiana Senate
- In office 1905–1909

Personal details
- Born: April 21, 1862 Center Point, Indiana, U.S.
- Died: April 26, 1919 (aged 57) Ashboro, Indiana, U.S
- Party: Democratic
- Education: Purdue University

Ralph Wilbur Moss (April 21, 1862 – April 26, 1919) was a U.S. representative from Indiana.

== Biography ==
Ralph Moss was born in Center Point, Indiana, the son of a farmer who had fought for the United States against the Confederacy in the American Civil War.

Moss was educated in the common schools of the township and attended Purdue University in West Lafayette, Indiana, for two years. He taught school in Sugar Ridge Township, and was principal of the graded schools in Harmony, Indiana. He subsequently became engaged in agricultural pursuits, and served as member of the Indiana State Senate from 1905 to 1909.

Moss was elected as a Democrat to the Sixty-first and to the three succeeding Congresses (March 4, 1909 – March 3, 1917). He served as chairman of the Committee on Expenditures in the Department of Agriculture in the Sixty-second Congress.

He was an unsuccessful candidate for reelection in 1916 to the Sixty-fifth Congress in a three-sided race featuring Republican Everett Sanders and four-time candidate for president, Socialist Eugene V. Debs.

Moss faced Sanders again in a 1918 rematch, unsuccessfully attempting to win a seat in the Sixty-sixth Congress. He retired to his farm near Ashboro, Indiana after the November loss.

Late in the morning of April 24, 1919, Moss entered his barn to water his livestock and was attacked by an angry bull, which gored and trampled him, breaking his wrist and crushing his entire left side. He was eventually extricated and rushed unconscious to Rawley Hospital, where he died two days later at 2:45 pm of the internal injuries he had sustained.

He was interred in Moss Cemetery, near his home.

U.S. House of Representatives
Preceded by Elias S. Holliday	Member of the U.S. House of Representatives from Indiana's 5th congressional district 1909–1917	Succeeded by Everett Sanders
