= List of killings by law enforcement officers in the United States, June 2025 =

This is a list of people reported killed by non-military law enforcement officers in the United States in June 2025, whether in the line of duty or not, and regardless of reason or method. The listing documents the occurrence of a death, making no implications regarding wrongdoing or justification on the part of the person killed or officer involved. Killings are arranged by date of the incident that caused death. Different death dates, if known, are noted in the description. The table below lists 120 people.

== June 2025 ==
Date	Name (age) of deceased	Race	Location	Description
2025-06-30	Daphine Mae Jennings (58)	Unknown	Pine Mountain, Georgia	A woman was shot and killed after she reportedly pointed a gun at Troup County deputies following a threatening suicide call.
2025-06-30	Joshua Coffey (48)	White	Niles Township, Michigan	South of Niles, a sheriff's deputy chased a man who fled from a vehicle. The deputy shot and killed Coffey after he pulled out a handgun and fired at the deputy. The footage was released.
2025-06-30	David Bahrami (26)	Middle Eastern	Antioch, California	Police shot and killed a man after responding to a family disturbance after the man ran towards officers with a knife. Police released the bodycam footage.
2025-06-29	Charles Samuel Urbach (38)	White	Jacksonville, Florida	Urbach was seen walking through backyards and attempting to break into a home. Upon arrival, JSO officers reportedly used force to arrest him since he struck one of them. He was then placed into a patrol car where he became unresponsive and died.
2025-06-28	James Thompson Jr. (64)	Unknown	Lincolnton, North Carolina	An officer shot and killed a man suspected of shooting a woman at a park.
2025-06-28	unidentified male	Unknown	Elk Grove, California	Police responded for a man under the influence of narcotics. They arrested him after a few minutes of struggle. He was then placed into a patrol car where he experienced medical emergency and died.
2025-06-28	unidentified male (72)	Unknown	West Allis, Wisconsin	West Allis police responded to a call and found a man armed with a handgun and suspected of shooting two neighbors, killing one. He reportedly refused to comply before five officers shot him.
2025-06-27	Damon Lamarr Johnson (52)	Unknown	Portland, Oregon	Police physically restrained and handcuffed Johnson, who was in a mental health crisis and was in a struggle with officers. Officers knelt on him for about four minutes before he was found unconscious. Medics took him to a hospital where he died. The footage was released.
2025-06-27	Edgar Cardenas	Hispanic	Mesa, Arizona	U.S. Marshals and Mesa Police officers attempted to arrest a known gang member on several warrants. Members of the task force shot and killed the man after he allegedly fired at them.
2025-06-27	Antonio Irene Betancourt (34)	Unknown	Winston-Salem, North Carolina	Police attempted to arrest Betancourt for several warrants. One officer shot and killed Betancourt after he allegedly shot the other officer in the ballistic vest.
2025-06-27	Kolton Griffith (27)	White	Phillipsburg, Kansas	Phillips County Undersheriff Brandon Gaede responded to a call about illegal fireworks being detonated and found probable cause to arrest the suspect, Griffith. During the arrest, Griffith pulled out a gun and shot Undersheriff Gaede, who still managed to return fire, killing him. Despite medical treatment, Gaede ultimately died at a local hospital less than an hour later.
2025-06-27	Patrick George Selvage (44)	Unknown	Crescent City, California	CHP troopers along with other emergency services responded to a report of a male subject covered in blood. Upon arrival, the male subject reportedly approached a medical personnel with a knife before being tased. He then reportedly approached two troopers and a Del Norte deputy before one of the troopers shot and killed him.
2025-06-27	Quinton Marquese Allen (31)	Black	Saginaw Township, Michigan	MSP troopers responded to a bank where Allen, wielding an unspecified weapon, barricaded himself with a female hostage. Police used a drone to bring a 24-ounce Faygo to the front, and trooper shot and killed Allen when he approached it. The victim was taken to a hospital for treatment.
2025-06-26	Sheldon Ennis (54)	Black	New York City, New York	Officers noticed Ennis with open container of alcohol in the park. Ennis reportedly failed to provide his ID before being taken into custody. He ran off and officers tackled him to the ground, striking his head, causing injuries. He suffered a cardiac arrest and died.
2025-06-26	Camden Skyler Childers (21)	White	Conover, North Carolina	Newton Police attempted to conduct a traffic stop on Childers, a motorcyclist who was accused of reckless driving. Childers then fled to Conover, where he crashed his motorcycle with a police cruiser. He was fatally shot by police following a fight. The officer was charged with second-degree murder in July.
2025-06-26	Bruce Ayer (71)	White	Henderson, Nevada	Police followed a stolen vehicle to a home. At the home, SWAT officers encountered a man, and shot him twice when he pointed a gun-like object at them. Police did not specify what object it is. The footage was released.
2025-06-25	Robert Wesley Crooks (74)	White	Spring Creek, Nevada	A woman reported that her husband was shooting at her through a wall. Upon arrival, Elko County deputies attempted to de-escalate the situation. The husband, Crooks, emerged from the garage with a rifle before they shot him dead. The footage was released by state police.
2025-06-25	Pytorcarcha Clark-Brooks (70)	Black	Baltimore, Maryland	A woman in behavioral health crisis attacked responding officers with a knife. Tasers were ineffective. Officers fatally shot her. The footage was released.
2025-06-25	Liam Gerald McCaul (23)	White	Botetourt County, Virginia	McCaul called the police to report that he had killed his father. When they tried to negotiate with him, he reportedly raised a gun toward the deputies, leading them to shoot and kill him.
2025-06-24	Dontae Maurice Melton Jr. (31)	Black	Baltimore, Maryland	Police restrained and handcuffed a man in mental health crisis for he was reportedly going in and out of traffic and was in danger. The man later became unresponsive. He died at a local hospital. His death has been ruled a homicide by coroner's office.
2025-06-24	Patrick Kerr (45)	White	Brooklyn, Ohio	Police from Parma Heights pursued Kerr into Brooklyn where he crashed and killed another driver. After a stand-off, during which Kerr threatened to shoot himself, an officer shot Kerr when he allegedly pointed a gun at them.
2025-06-24	Rhino Simboli (63)	White	Lubbock, Texas	Texas Tech Police officers were checking on a suspicious vehicle outside the Jones AT&T Stadium when the driver produced a gun and fired at them, injuring two officers. Officers shot and killed the suspect.
2025-06-23	Todd Hannigan (57)	White	Orlando, Florida	A woman called the police regarding that her boyfriend had held her at knifepoint. When Orange County deputies and SWAT team came to arrest the man, he moved toward them with the knife. Two deputies shot the man in response. The man, 57-year-old Todd Hannigan, later died from his injuries at the hospital. The footage was released.
2025-06-23	José Chéveres Ramos (28)	Hispanic	Mayagüez, Puerto Rico	Police attempted to pull over a vehicle on the highway containing a wanted fugitive, who had escaped custody after being convicted of multiple murders. During the pursuit, an individual in the vehicle fired at police, who shot back, striking Chéveres Ramos, one of the fugitive's accomplices. The fugitive and a second accomplice were arrested.
2025-06-23	James Pulliam Jr.	Black	Parkland, Washington	Attacked police with piece of lumber
2025-06-23	Bryan Allen (46)	White	Denver, Colorado	Denver Police were checking if a man or woman had any outstanding warrants for their arrests when the man asked if he could leave. When they refused, the man ran off and shot at officers during the chase. A Denver Public Schools officer and a Denver Police officer shot back, killing him. The footage was released.
2025-06-23	Jabari Latrell Peoples (18)	Black	Homewood, Alabama	An officer was investigating a suspicious vehicle at a park. Peoples, who was in the vehicle, allegedly got into a physical altercation with the officer before pulling out a gun. The officer shot Peoples in the back and killed him. District attorney said the shooting was justified and the police will not release video to public. Peoples' family was shown the footage.
2025-06-23	unidentified male	Unknown	Eagle Mountain, Utah	Police learned an aggravated sexual assault incident occurred overnight with a victim sustained various injuries, including strangulation. Due to the extent of violence, SWAT team was deployed to suspect's residence. During the encounter, the suspect reportedly pointed a gun at the members, prompting them to shoot and kill the suspect.
2025-06-23	Andrew Osborne (44)	White	Little Rock, Arkansas	Little Rock officers responded to a call and found a person armed with a weapon on the porch. Officer(s) shot the individual dead after they reportedly refused to drop it.
2025-06-23	Patrick Brian Shoptaw (39)	White	Memphis, Tennessee	A police officer responded to a reported stabbing at a gas station in the Parkway Village neighborhood. The officer shot and killed the suspect after he allegedly attempted to stab an officer.
2025-06-23	Jesus Ramirez Jr. (51)	Unknown	Colorado Springs, Colorado	In the early morning, police responded to an apartment for a report of shots fired and encountered a man holding a gun. Police shot and killed the man after he fired a shot at them with a Kimber .38-Super. The footage was released.
2025-06-22	Byron LaJonta Jackson (45)	Black	Irmo, South Carolina	Irmo Police responded to a report of a fight and arrest the suspect after a chase. After being retrained, the suspect began having trouble breathing. He was transported to a hospital where he died three days later. Two officers are on leave.
2025-06-22	Christian Javan Latimore (37)	Pacific Islander	Honolulu, Hawaii	Police responded to calls that a man on a boat was firing at people on another boat. The suspect barricaded himself in the boat, with officers observing him having possession of a hammer, long gun, and sword. Following a stand-off, an officer shot the man in the chest when he allegedly pointed the gun at police.
2025-06-22	unidentified male	Unknown	St. Louis, Missouri	St. Louis Police responded to a shooting and found a man who had been shot. Later they located the suspect who was riding a moped. After a chase which ended in a vacant lot, the suspect reportedly reached into his bag, refusing to follow orders. In response, two officers fatally shot him.
2025-06-22	Jose Enrique Cartagena Chacon (25)	Hispanic	Lenexa, Kansas	Lenexa Officers responded to a report of an armed man at an apartment complex. The officers spotted Chacon inside his vehicle with a gun on his lap. Chacon picked the gun up when an officer opened fire. The footage was released and the officers were cleared by attorney.
2025-06-21	Thomas Alberto Tamayo Lizarraga (45)	Hispanic	Fontana, California	An off-duty officer reportedly witnessed a shooting that killed two people in Fontana. In response, he shot and killed the shooter.
2025-06-20	Dajshon Travis Asbell (32)	Black	Keystone Heights, Florida	Clay County deputies went to serve multiple arrest warrants on Asbell, who then tried to stab a deputy with a syringe before barricading himself. Police said negotiation efforts were ineffective. Asbell later ran out of the building with a sharp object, reportedly attempting to stab a K9. Deputies then shot him. He died at a hospital three days later.
2025-06-20	Peter Villalobos (27)	Hispanic	Riverside, California	Riverside Police responded to a call for a man locking himself inside the restroom. When the man finally came out, he became combative, leading officers to use force to arrest him. The man later died. The man also had an outstanding warrant at the time. The footage had been released.
2025-06-20	unidentified	Unknown	Winnfield, Louisiana	Winn Parish deputies responded to a domestic violence involving an armed individual. The individual barricaded themself inside a room when they arrived. A deputy shot them when they exited the room with a gun. They died on July 2nd.
2025-06-20	Richard Skyles III	White	Mandeville, Louisiana	St. Tammany Parish deputies received a report of a woman being shot. When they arrived at the residence, a man reportedly opened fire on them, prompting them to return fire, killing him. The woman was found dead inside the residence.
2025-06-20	Simon Robledo (28)	Hispanic	Chula Vista, California	A police cruiser which was responding to a call collided with motorcyclist at an intersection. The motorcyclist succumbed to his injuries.
2025-06-20	Brent Bucholtz (59)	White	Highland Park, Illinois	Police responded to a call of a man lying in a road. After he entered his home, Bucholtz allegedly exited with a knife and charged at the officers. Officers shot and killed him.
2025-06-19	Trey Rashon Lovett (35)	Black	Greenville, South Carolina	Deputies who responded to an armed robbery deployed a K9 to arrest the suspect, Lovett. During the arrest, the K9 bit Lovett. He was later transported to a hospital where he died of cardiac arrest.
2025-06-19	Daniel Areh (27)	Unknown	Rosharon, Texas	A woman called the police about an impending disturbance of a man, who was also wanted by the police. When deputies located the man's vehicle and attempted to stop him, he fled, which led to a chase. The chase ended after he crashed into a ditch. Police said he brandished a knife when two deputies fatally shot him.
2025-06-19	Daniel Lewis Hayes (37)	Black	Pensacola, Florida	Deputies received a report of a man wanted for felony warrants being spotted at the Arby's, where Hayes worked. When they tried to arrest him, he fled before a struggle with one of the deputies. During which, he pulled out a knife. Deputies shot and killed him after he reportedly moved toward them with it.
2025-06-19	Victor Manuel Carrillo (27)	Hispanic	Los Angeles, California	Police responded to calls of a man attempting to break into apartment buildings in East Hollywood. Officers spotted Carillo on the second floor, where he threw several objects at them. They followed Carillo into an apartment, where they shot him as he held a knife and metal chair. The bodycam footage was released by LAPD.
2025-06-18	Raymond Benedetti (48)	White	Gifford, Florida	A woman called police to report her son, Benedetti, stole her vehicle. The sheriff's office said that after locating the vehicle, Benedetti made movements inside the car and refused to follow instructions. Deputies shot and killed the man when he allegedly charged at them.
2025-06-18	Mark W. Bemis (62)	White	Mina, New York	Responding to a domestic violence call, Chautauqua County deputies shot and killed a man who fired at them with a shotgun. One deputy was shot and injured. The footage was released by Attorney General.
2025-06-17	Francis Alcantar-Chavez (23)	Hispanic	Sweet Springs, Missouri	A Missouri State trooper noticed a motorcyclist who matched a double-homicide suspect's description and pursued him. The suspect would later crashed into a cruiser. He then ran on foot and fired at the trooper, wounding him, before being killed by returned fire. The suspect, Alcantar-Chavez, was tied to a double-homicide incident in Taylor on June 15th.
2025-06-17	Desiree Herrera (36)	Hispanic	Albuquerque, New Mexico	APD officers were dispatched regarding a woman in mental health crisis disarmed a security guard before threatening people with that gun in a parking lot. Police stated that the woman fired at a SUV before exchanging fire with them. She was shot and killed on scene.
2025-06-17	Kristofer Laboy (24)	Hispanic	West Little River, Florida	Deputies chased Laboy in unmarked vehicles after he fled a traffic stop for tinted windows, ending the pursuit at a dead end. A deputy shot Laboy after he exited his vehicle and approached them with a gun. The footage was released.
2025-06-17	Bilal "BJ" Abdullah (36)	Black	Baltimore, Maryland	Officers in an unmarked cruiser approached Abdullah, an arabber, who they believed had a gun on his person. An officer exited the vehicle and followed Abdullhah, who ran and fired at the officers, striking one in the foot. Three officers shot and killed Abdullah. The footage has been released by Baltimore Police.
2025-06-16	Gary Leon Eagle Jr. (44)	White	Red Bluff, California	Red Bluff Police attempted to detain a man who possibly stole a bicycle. They used force to detain him as he resisted. The man later died.
2025-06-16	Hayley Michelle Davidson (28)	White	Beattyville, Kentucky	Lee County Special Deputy Bearl D. Ashcraft Jr. shot and killed his girlfriend before turning the gun on himself.
2025-06-16	Eric Gallagher (24)	Hispanic	Clovis, New Mexico	US Marshals was attempting arrest Gallagher for an outstanding probation violation warrant. When marshals approached the house, Gallagher fled the scene. He was shot and killed after he reportedly presented a gun during the chase.
2025-06-16	Denny Benka (46)	White	Churchill County, Nevada	A sheriff's deputy responded to a vehicle fire at an RV encampment and found Benka sitting on the porch of his RV near the fire. The deputy asked Benka to move so firefighters could handle the fire, but he did not comply and brandished a hatchet. Benka then entered his RV and returned with a pneumatic rifle, and the deputy shot him after he pointed it at him. The edited footage was released by state police.
2025-06-16	Eddie Hill (41)	White	Oklahoma City, Oklahoma	OCPD responded to a call regarding a suicidal man before encountering Hill, who was armed with a knife at the front door of a home. He charged at an officer and was shot dead. The footage has been released.
2025-06-15	unidentified male	Unknown	Bruneau, Idaho	Owyhee County deputies responded to a call of an unwanted person and confronted a suspect who was reportedly armed with a rifle. That's when deputies shot and killed him.
2025-06-15	unidentified male	Hispanic	Weatherford, Texas	
2025-06-15	Keontae Qushaun Davis (25)	Black	Marksville, Louisiana	
2025-06-15	Clayton Tyler Dodson (25)	White	Columbia, Tennessee	
2025-06-15	Ryan Tietsort (43)	Unknown	Spokane Valley, Washington	
2025-06-14	Donald Teeter Jr. (68)	White	Caldwell, Idaho	Police responded to a report of a man suffering from an unknown medical condition, behaving erratically, and making suicidal statements. They physically restrained the man with body weight and handcuff. The man, Teeter, lost consciousness shortly after being handcuffed and died as a result.
2025-06-14	Todd Patrick Smith (58)	White	Aurora, Colorado	Aurora Police fatally shot a man after he retrieved a handgun from a toolbox and pointed it at officers following a domestic dispute call. The footage was released by police.
2025-06-14	unidentified male (18)	Unknown	St. Cloud, Florida	
2025-06-14	Patrick David Hatcher (61)	White	Summerville, South Carolina	Dorchester County deputies responded to a mobile home for welfare check and engaged a suspect after hearing gunshots. The suspect was shot dead during the encounter.
2025-06-14	Norman Lindo (30)	Hispanic	Miami, Florida	In Wynwood, Miami officers confronted a gunman and shots were fired. The gunman was killed by police gunfire. A woman who was celebrating her birthday was also struck and killed.
2025-06-14	Evelyn Valdes (28)	Hispanic	Miami, Florida	In Wynwood, Miami officers confronted a gunman and shots were fired. The gunman was killed by police gunfire. A woman who was celebrating her birthday was also struck and killed.
2025-06-14	Kyle Lambert (34)	Unknown	Houston, Alaska	AST troopers were executing a felony arrest warrant for Lambert. When they located him in a camper inside the property, he refused to exit and reportedly produced a handgun. In response, troopers shot and killed him.
2025-06-13	Ladarius Collins (21)	Black	Gresham, Oregon	An armed suspect was fleeing from police after they attempted to arrest him for assault and other crimes. A sheriff's deputy later found him and shot him dead in a nearby neighborhood. A handgun was recovered at the scene.
2025-06-13	Timothy Cook (35)	Black	Memphis, Tennessee	During a celebration outside a liquor store, Memphis Police officers noticed a suspicious vehicle and came to investigate. The driver, Cook, reportedly sped it up and struck an officer. The officer's partner shot Cook in response. Cook died three days later.
2025-06-13	Francisco Garcia-Vega (53)	Hispanic	Frostproof, Florida	Polk County deputies were attempting to arrest a suspect when the suspect's brother, Garcia-Vega, charged and struck a deputy's head with a lumber, leaving him with serious injuries. When he tried to hit the deputy again, other deputies fired at him, killing him.
2025-06-12	Marco Moseley (40)	Black	Washington, D.C.	A U.S. Marshal shot and killed Moseley. Few details were released.
2025-06-12	Andy Ortiz (35)	Hispanic	Beaumont, Texas	Ortiz shot a BPD officer in the head with a pellet rifle. Two officers returned fire.
2025-06-11	Jason Simmons (40)	White	Saucier, Mississippi	Harrison County deputies responded to serve a court order for Simmons. During which, he fired at them, which resulted a 4-hour-standoff with SWAT team. In the night, a shootout occurred and he was killed by deputies.
2025-06-11	Jacob Allen Rose (24)	White	Gilbert, Arizona	Gilbert Police were responding to a welfare check and found Rose, who was sleeping in the driver's seat of a vehicle. Police then blocked his vehicle with cruisers. Officers shot and killed him after he rammed the cruisers and pointed a rifle at them. The rifle, three handguns, a bullet-resistant, cocaine, ecstasy and alprazolam were found in his vehicle. The footage was released.
2025-06-11	Felipe Millan-Gomez (33)	Hispanic	Carlisle, Arkansas	ASP troopers along with US Marshals stopped a suspect who was wanted in an armed carjacking and kidnapping which occurred in Michigan. The suspect then exited the vehicle and brandished a weapon before being shot by state troopers.
2025-06-10	Nathaniel Bailey (44)	White	Albert Lea, Minnesota	Freeborn County deputies responded to a domestic violence report which possibly involved firearms. When they arrived, they learned that the suspect had texted a woman stating that he had killed his mother. A pursuit later ensued after deputies found him in a car. He was shot dead after he exited the car with a gun. A woman was found dead inside his property. The footage has been released.
2025-06-10	Cristian Javier Estrada Perez	Hispanic	Dade City, Florida	Pasco Sheriff's Office was serving a court order for the suspect for a mental health evaluation. During which, he fired four rounds from a gun strapped to his hand. Deputies returned fire and killed him. The footage was released.
2025-06-09	Charles Powell Jr. (64)	White	Corydon, Kentucky	Henderson County deputies responded to a family disturbance. Upon arrival, Powell Jr reportedly charged at them with a machete. A deputy deployed his taser, which was ineffective, before fatally shooting him.
2025-06-09	Micah Booker (23)	Black	Columbia, Maryland	A 911 caller told Howard County Police that he was stabbed multiple times. The suspect, Micah Booker, later admitted to dispatchers that he stabbed his brother. Police later located Booker and fatally shot him as he approached an officer with the spear. The footage was released.
2025-06-09	Federico Rodriguez (45)	Hispanic	Lynwood, California	LA deputies responded to a robbery in progress in a residence where they encountered the suspect, Rodriguez, who was stabbing the victim with a knife in the hallway. He was then fatally shot by deputies. The footage was released.
2025-06-09	Keith Lee West III (48)	White	Nashville, Tennessee	West charged at an officer with a handgun before being fatally shot. Nashville Police had released the bodycam footage.
2025-06-08	Lane Murphy (22)	Unknown	Hot Springs, Arkansas	Murphy was heading north when he crossed the center line and struck a Garland deputy's patrol vehicle. He was killed and the deputy was injured following the crash.
2025-06-08	Derek Holland (39)	White	Bracey, Virginia	
2025-06-08	Ramon Morales (50)	Unknown	Cynthiana, Kentucky	
2025-06-08	Dawson McCracken (22)	Black	Cookeville, Tennessee	
2025-06-08	Austin Walters (21)	White	Blountville, Tennessee	
2025-06-07	Eli Reiter (54)	White	Harper, Oregon	
2025-06-07	Terry Washington Jr. (30)	Black	Orlando, Florida	Orange County Police responded to a report of a man acting erratically. Upon arrival, he tried to grab a deputy's gun and attempted to stab him. The deputy shot and killed him. The footage was released.
2025-06-07	Erick Berrios (31)	Hispanic	Lancaster, California	Berrios, a robbery suspect, was killed by a LA sheriff's deputy during a shootout. One deputy involved in the shootout was injured. The footage has been released.
2025-06-06	Joshua R. Stanka (42)	White	Scottsville, Kentucky	Deputies responded to a domestic disturbance and shot Stanka, who was reportedly armed with a gun.
2025-06-06	unidentified male (51)	Unknown	Sherrelwood, Colorado	Adams County deputies were called for a welfare check at a home. When arrived arrived, the suspect reportedly confronted them with a knife. Multiple less-lethal devices were used on him but were all ineffective, which led the deputies to fatally shoot the man. After a safety sweep, police found a couple deceased inside, they believed the suspect killed them.
2025-06-06	Jesse Shelton (43)	White	Creal Springs, Illinois	A home invasion suspect was shot dead by a deputy after he reportedly illegally entered a second home and pointed a gun at police.
2025-06-06	Charles "Rick" Nesbitt (63)	Unknown	Pittsburgh, Pennsylvania	Officers responded to a domestic disturbance report and to serve a protection-from-abuse order in Brighton Heights neighborhood. Once they got inside, a man stabbed one of the officers. A second officer shot and killed him.
2025-06-05	Jacie Louise Harrison (22)	White	Clayton, Georgia	Rabun County deputies responded to a call about Harrison trying to enter a house without permission. They tased and arrested her when encountering her armed with a stick. She was later placed in a holding cell and ultimately died.
2025-06-05	Nicholas Bakewell (36)	White	Willits, California	Deputies responded to an assault of a driver by a hitchhiker. When they found the suspect, Bakewell, who was under mental health crisis, deputies tased him before physically restraining him, leaving him facing down on the ground for about a minute after being handcuffed before officers noticed signs of distress. Bakewell was later pronounced dead on-scene by EMS. The footage was released and the family filed a wrongful death federal lawsuit against Mendocino County Sheriff’s Department deputies.
2025-06-05	Krystal Rivera (36)	Hispanic	Chicago, Illinois	Officers on a tactical team were chasing a suspect after he fled an investigatory stop. They chased the suspect into the second floor of the apartment into a home, where they were confronted with a second person who pointed a rifle at them. Later reports indicated that the only person who opened fire in the situation was an officer. The bullet he fired struck Chicago Police Officer Rivera, killing her. Several people involved were taken into custody. Records also show that the officer who killed Rivera was in a relationship with her before breaking up. A Cook County judge blocked the releasing of the bodycam footage in the shooting.The footage was later released in April 2026.
2025-06-05	Nicholas David Anderson (29)	White	Loleta, California	Anderson reportedly charged at a Humboldt County deputy with a knife. In response, the deputy shot him dead. Sheriff's Office said the shooting was captured by eyewitnesses and on the deputies' bodycams.
2025-06-05	Brian C. Czornyj (36)	White	Poughkeepsie, New York	Police responded to a report of a man attacking Mobile Crisis Team members with a sword. Upon arrival, the man ignored officers' commands to drop the sword, prompting a Poughkeepsie officer to shoot and kill the man. The footage was released by state attorney general.
2025-06-05	Scott Hartley Hansen (34)	Unknown	Broomfield, Colorado	Police initially responded to reports of a man who threatened to hurt himself in a parking lot. The man was seen holding a gun which led to the response of Crisis Negotiations Team. After several hours of negotiations, for reasons currently unknown, police fatally shot the man.
2025-06-05	John Augustine Tangney O'Kelly (38)	Unknown	Tyler, Texas	Tyler Police responded to a report of a suspicious person and a disturbance inside of a home. They entered the residence where they saw O’Kelly with a noose. For reasons unknown, the incident escalated. Officer(s) shot and killed him.
2025-06-05	unidentified male	Unknown	Dallas, Texas	A police pursuit ensued after three men reportedly carjacked and stole a Mustang. During the chase, the suspects drove it on the wrong side of the highway and collided with a police SUV. One suspect was killed, four others including two officers were injured.
2025-06-05	unidentified female	Unknown	Alvin, Texas	Deputies were executing a narcotics search warrant at a residence in Alvin. They stated that a woman pointed a gun at them before two deputies opened fire.
2025-06-05	Matthew Cardon (43)	White	Peoria, Arizona	Peoria officers responded to a possible kidnapping attempt. The report stated that a man attempted to kidnap a woman and a child on the stroller. The woman's husband along with a neighbor later chased the suspect down the street into a dead end, where police arrived. An altercation reportedly ensued before an officer shot and killed the suspect.
2025-06-04	Aaron Krout (35)	White	Cory, Indiana	Krout fled a traffic stop before a pursuit ensued. ISP troopers along with sheriff's office deployed spike strips and initiated PIT maneuver on his vehicle to terminate the chase. Police later rushed him to a hospital, where he died, after a standoff which police deployed "extrication tactics." Police stated Krout was under the influence of a controlled substance during the chase.
2025-06-04	unidentified male (34)	Unknown	Forest Lakes, Arizona	Deputies pursued a man wanted for two drive-by shootings in Phoenix. After stopping the vehicle with spike strips, deputies fatally shot the man when he shot at officers.
2025-06-04	Jose Martinez (40)	Hispanic	Oklahoma City, Oklahoma	Police attempted to arrest Martinez on multiple warrants for rape. Following a foot chase, Martinez dropped a handgun. A sergeant shot and killed Martinez when he picked up the handgun. The footage was released by Oklahoma City Police.
2025-06-04	Donald Matthews IV	White	Hamilton, North Carolina	Police engaged in a stand-off with a man during an investigation. After five hours, an officer from Greenville shot and killed the man.
2025-06-03	Derek Blakely (22)	White	Flagstaff, Arizona	A Flagstaff police officer struck Blakely, a skateboarder, with his patrol car. Blakely ultimately died at a hospital.
2025-06-03	Shawn Dylan Burt (52)	Unknown	Garland, Texas	A motel called police to report Burt overstayed his reservation, with SWAT being called in after he allegedly pointed a gun at officers. After tear gas was deployed, police shot Burt when he allegedly pointed the gun at another officer. A second body was found in the room, having been shot to death. Police believe the second man was killed before the stand-off.
2025-06-03	Johnathan Zuccarini (32)	White	Dalton, Georgia	Whitfield County Sheriff’s Office and Dalton Police were conducting a narcotics investigation. When they attempted to arrest Zuccarini, he reportedly pointed a gun at them before being shot and killed.
2025-06-03	Ronald Gainer Jr. (35)	Black	Los Angeles, California	LAPD responded to shots fired calls in Harvard Heights and fatally shot a suspect who was armed with a firearm. The footage was released by LAPD due to officer-involved shooting policies.
2025-06-03	Antonio Herrera (36)	Hispanic	Pueblo, Colorado	A Pueblo police officer hit a shoplifter with his patrol vehicle after the shoplifter allegedly pulled out a gun while fleeing on foot. The suspect died on scene.
2025-06-03	Kenneth Wayne Jones (58)	White	Denton County, Texas	Police were serving an arrest warrant to Jones. During which, Jones reportedly pointed a gun at them. Deputies fatally shot him.
2025-06-03	Thomas Antonio Jackson (41)	Black	Shelby Township, Michigan	After being pulled over, a man fled a traffic stop on foot. An officer shot and killed the man after he pointed a gun at the officer. The officer involved was cleared by prosecutors and the footage was released during a news conference.
2025-06-02	Christopher Knels (31)	White	East Fairview, North Dakota	Officers responding to a suicidal man found Knels barricaded in a home. Knels allegedly brandished a gun at an officer, who fired and killed the suspect.
2025-06-01	Eliser Rivera Jr. (51)	Hispanic	Atlanta, Georgia	An officer working as a security guard at an apartment complex shot and killed Rivera when he allegedly charged the officer with a pipe.
2025-06-01	Parker Grayson Brown (29)	White	Tulsa, Oklahoma	Brown shot a jogger in the leg at a park, before allegedly shooting at responding officers and firefighters. Brown fled to a nearby cul-de-sac, where he was shot and killed by police.
2025-06-01	Salvador Valdiviezo (35)	Hispanic	El Paso, Texas	As officers responded to a domestic violence call, Valdiviezo shot at two of them, striking an officer. Officers returned fire and killed Valdiviezo. El Paso Police Department released the bodycam footage.

== See also ==
- Death in custody § United States
- Henry A. Wallace Police Crime Public Database
- List of cases of police brutality
- List of countries with annual rates and counts for killings by law enforcement officers
- List of law enforcement officers killed in the line of duty in the United States
- List of law enforcement officers convicted for an on-duty killing in the United States
- List of shootings by US immigration agents
- List of police reforms related to the George Floyd protests
- List of unarmed African Americans killed by law enforcement officers in the United States
- Lists of killings by law enforcement officers
- Police brutality in the United States
- Police misconduct § United States
- Police riot § United States
- Police use of deadly force in the United States
