= Chalybeate Springs =

Chalybeate Springs may refer to:

- Chalybeate Springs, Georgia
- Chalybeate Springs, North Carolina

== See also ==
- Chalybeate (disambiguation)
