= Mountain pine (disambiguation) =

Mountain pine (Pinus mugo) is a species of pine tree. Mountain pine can also refer to:

== Botany ==
- Mountain pine (Halocarpus bidwillii)
- Table mountain pine (Pinus pungens)

== Places ==
- Mountain Pine, Arkansas, U.S.A.
- The Mountain pine forest, Russia
- Mountain Pine Ridge Forest Reserve, Belize

== See also ==
- Mountain pine beetle
- Pine Mountain (disambiguation)
