= Pine Mountain Valley, Georgia =

- Unincorporated community
- Location within Georgia Location within the United States
- Coordinates: 32°47′55″N 84°49′24″W
- Country: United States
- State: Georgia
- County: Harris
- Elevation: 873 ft (266 m)
- Time zone: UTC-5 (Eastern (EST))
  - Summer (DST): UTC-4 (EDT)
- ZIP code: 31823
- Area code: 706
- GNIS feature ID: 356473

Pine Mountain Valley is located in Harris County, Georgia, United States. Its ZIP code is 31823.

== Geography ==
Pine Mountain Valley is located at 32° 47′ 55″ N, 84° 49′ 24″ W (32.798611 N, -84.823333 W). The community is located at the intersection of Georgia State Routes 116 and 354. GA-116 runs from west to east through the community, leading east 9 mi (14 km) to Shiloh and southwest 4 mi (6.4 km) to Hamilton, the Harris County seat. GA-354 runs northwest 7 mi (11 km) to the city of Pine Mountain. The community is located in the Piedmont region of the state just to the south of the Pine Mountain Range.
