= Everett Sanders =

American politician (1882–1950)

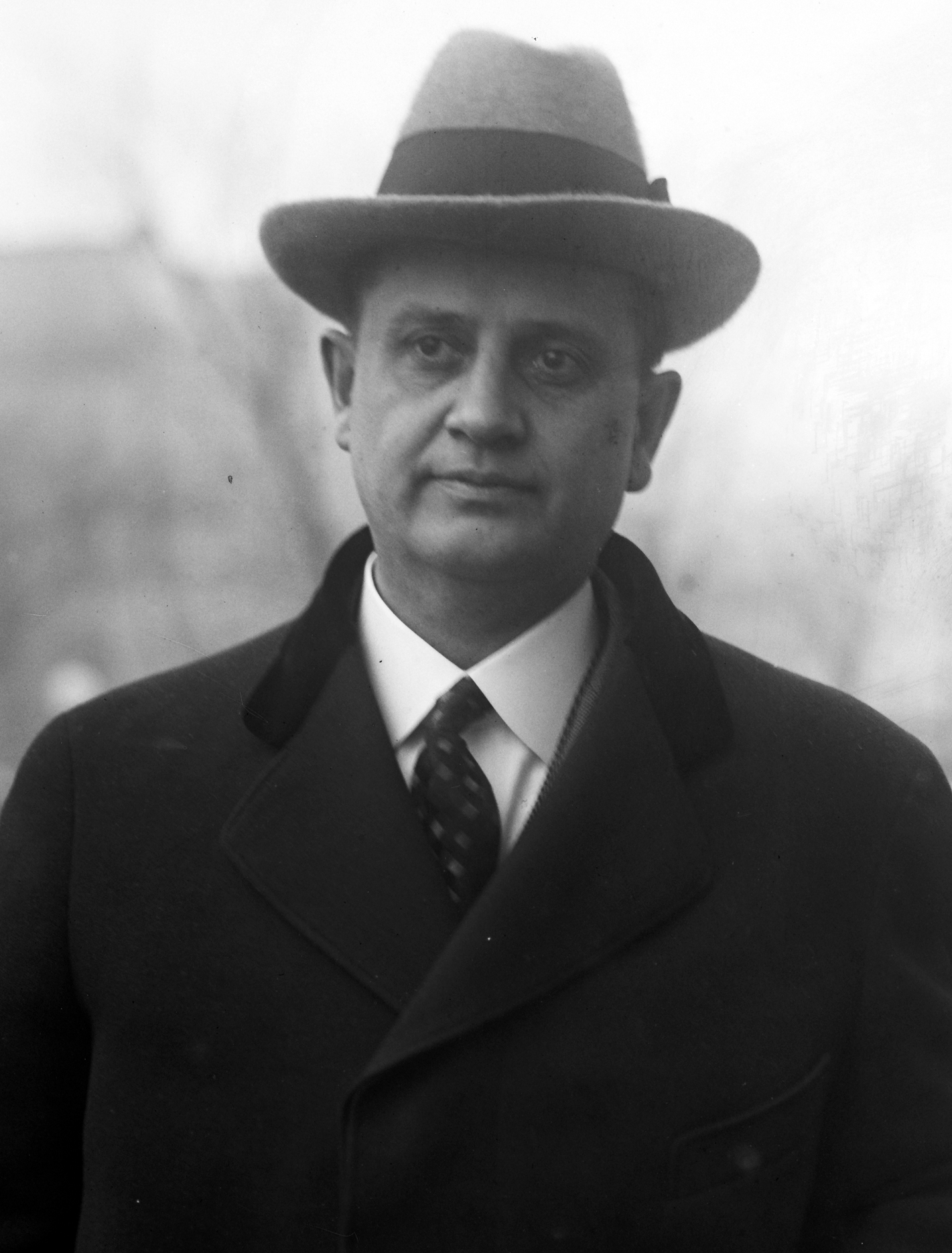
- Sanders in 1925

Chair of the Republican National Committee
- In office June 17, 1932 – June 5, 1934
- Preceded by: Simeon D. Fess
- Succeeded by: Henry P. Fletcher

Secretary to the President
- In office March 4, 1925 – March 4, 1929
- President: Calvin Coolidge
- Preceded by: C. Bascom Slemp
- Succeeded by: Walter Newton

Member of the U.S. House of Representatives from Indiana's 5th district
- In office March 4, 1917 – March 4, 1925
- Preceded by: Ralph Moss
- Succeeded by: Noble J. Johnson

Personal details
- Born: James Everett Sanders; March 8, 1882 Coalmont, Indiana, U.S.
- Died: May 12, 1950 (aged 68) Washington, D.C., U.S.
- Party: Republican
- Spouse: Ella Neal
- Education: Indiana State University (BA); Indiana University, Bloomington (LLB)

James Everett Sanders (March 8, 1882 – May 12, 1950) was an American political figure. He was presidential secretary to President Calvin Coolidge and chairman of the Republican National Committee. He served four terms in the U.S. House of Representatives from 1917 to 1925, representing Indiana.

== Biography ==
Born in Coalmont, Indiana, Sanders attended the Indiana State Normal School (now Indiana State University) and then graduated from Indiana University. He practiced law in Terre Haute, Indiana.

=== Political career ===
From 1917 until 1925 Sanders represented Indiana in the United States Congress. He declined to be re-nominated in 1924, and instead became director of the Speakers' Bureau of the Republican National Committee. Subsequently, in 1925, he replaced C. Bascom Slemp as the personal secretary to President Coolidge early in his second term. During his time as presidential secretary (a position equivalent to the current White House Chief of Staff) Sanders amassed a collection of presidential speeches that became known as the 'Everett Sanders Papers', which contain speeches from June 22, 1925, until February 22, 1929. Sanders also became a member of the Alfalfa Club after 1926.

Sanders was so highly regarded that, after leaving the position in 1929 after Coolidge's second term, President Herbert Hoover appointed him to chair the Republican National Committee, a position he held from 1932 until he stepped down in 1934 after Hoover's disastrous re-election campaign.

=== Death ===
Sanders died in Washington, D.C., in 1950, and is buried in Indiana, in the Highland Lawn Cemetery in Terre Haute.

U.S. House of Representatives
Preceded by Ralph Moss	Member of the U.S. House of Representatives from Indiana's 5th congressional district 1917–1925	Succeeded by Noble J. Johnson
Political offices
Preceded by C. Bascom Slemp	Secretary to the President; 1925–1929	Succeeded by George E. Akerson
Party political offices
Preceded by Simeon D. Fess	Chair of the Republican National Committee; 1932–1934	Succeeded by Henry P. Fletcher
