= Georgia State Route 354 =

State highway in Georgia, United States

State Route 354
- SR 354 highlighted in red

Route information
- Maintained by GDOT
- Length: 6.9 mi (11.1 km)
- Existed: 1963–present

Major junctions
- South end: SR 116 in Pine Mountain Valley
- US 27 / SR 1 in Pine Mountain
- North end: SR 18 west of Pine Mountain

Location
- Country: United States
- State: Georgia
- Counties: Harris

Highway system
- Georgia State Highway System; Interstate; US; State; Special
← SR 353	→ SR 355

State Route 354 (SR 354) is a 6.9-mile-long (11.1 km), arc-shaped state highway located entirely within Harris County in the west-central part of the U.S. state of Georgia. It starts out in a north-northeasterly direction and curves to a westerly direction. This highway was built in the early 1960s, on the same alignment as it travels today.

== Route description ==
SR 354 begins at an intersection with SR 116 in Pine Mountain Valley. It continues northward, ascending the Pine Mountain Range. Then, it begins traveling to the north-northeast and enters F. D. Roosevelt State Park prior to meeting Georgia State Route 190 on top of the mountain ridge at a historic bridge built by the Civilian Conservation Corps. It begins to curve to the west and exits the park. SR 354 enters Pine Mountain, where it intersects US 27/SR 1 (Main Street). The route continues to the west until it meets its northern terminus, an intersection with SR 18 west of the town in Champion Crossroad. The route serves as a connector and access road for traffic visiting F. D. Roosevelt State Park.

SR 354 is not part of the National Highway System, a system of roadways important to the nation's economy, defense, and mobility.

== History ==
SR 354 was built, and paved, on its current alignment between 1960 and 1963.

== Major intersections ==
The entire route is in Harris County.

Location	mi	km	Destinations	Notes
Pine Mountain Valley	0.0	0.0	SR 116 – Hamilton, Shiloh	Southern terminus
F. D. Roosevelt State Park	3.2	5.1	SR 190 – Manchester	
Pine Mountain	5.7	9.2	US 27 / SR 1 (Main Street)	
Champion Crossroad	6.9	11.1	SR 18 to I-185 – West Point, Durand	Northern terminus
1.000 mi = 1.609 km; 1.000 km = 0.621 mi
