= Jeffers Bridge =

- U.S. National Register of Historic Places
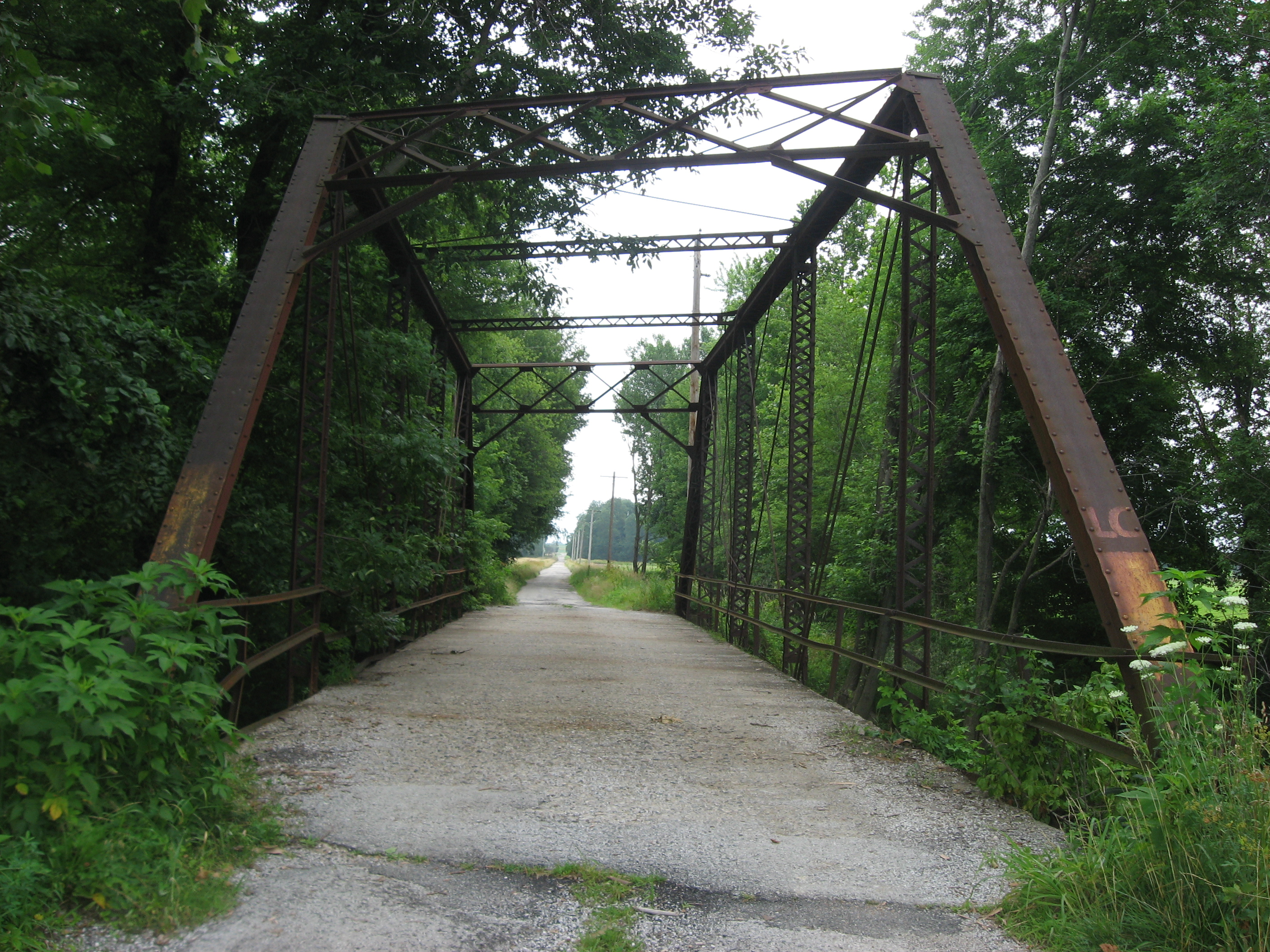
- Jeffers Bridge, July 2011

- Location within Clay County, Indiana Location within Indiana Location within the United States
- Location: County Road 200S over Birch Creek, north of Clay City, Perry Township and Sugar Ridge Township, Clay County, Indiana
- Coordinates: 39°21′31″N 87°8′32″W
- Area: less than one acre
- Built: 1926
- Built by: Vincennes Bridge Company
- Architectural style: Pratt Through Truss
- NRHP reference No.: 00000213
- Added to NRHP: March 15, 2000

Jeffers Bridge, also known as the Birch Creek Bridge and Clay County Bridge #127, is a historic Pratt through truss bridge located in Perry Township and Sugar Ridge Township, Clay County, Indiana. It was built by the Vincennes Bridge Company in 1926. It once carried County Road 200S over Birch Creek. It is currently closed to traffic from disrepair. The bridge measures 91 feet long and rests on concrete abutments and wingwalls.

It was added to the National Register of Historic Places in 2000.
