= Art, Indiana =

Art
- Unincorporated community
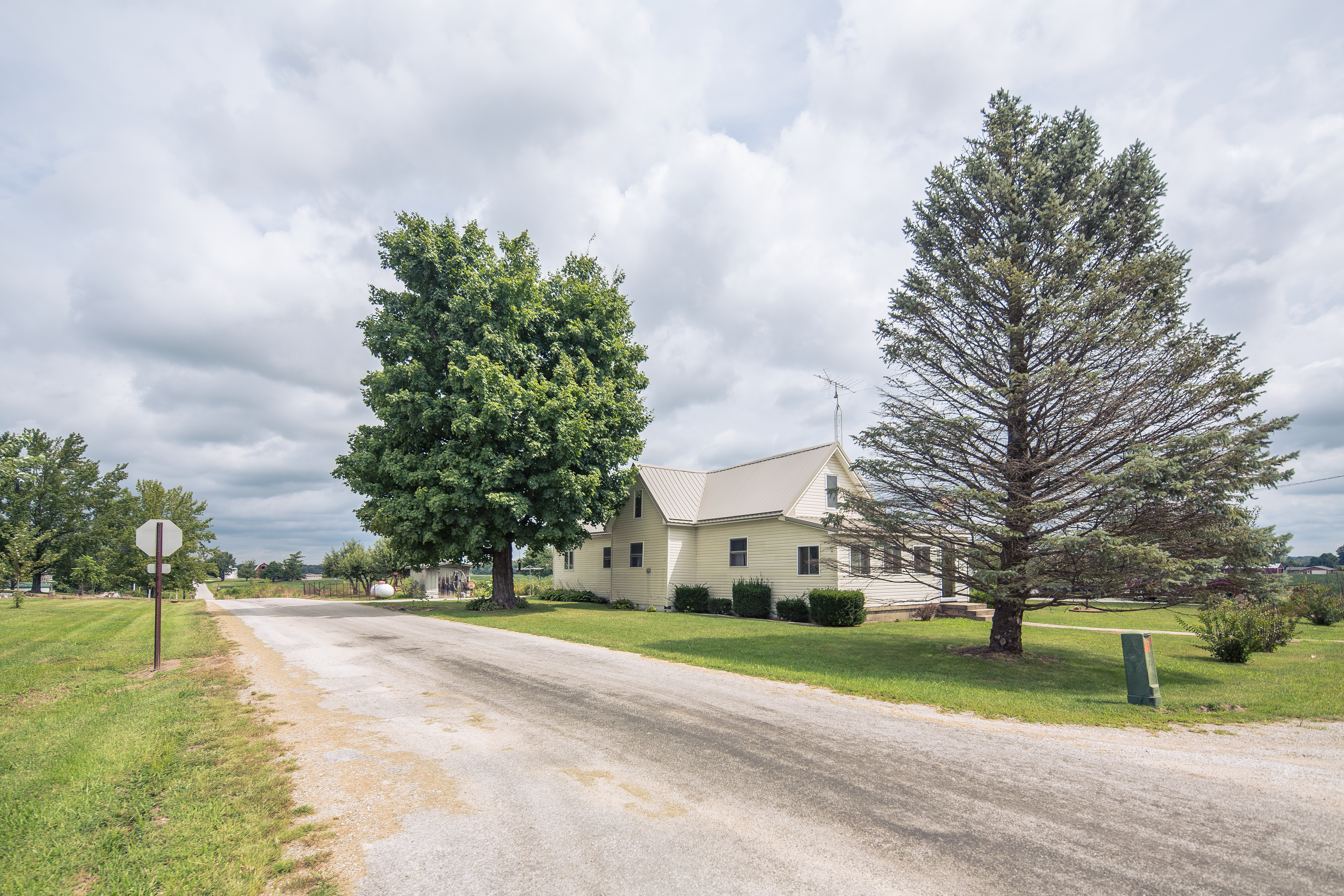

- Location in Clay County
- Coordinates: 39°24′10″N 87°09′19″W
- Country: United States
- State: Indiana
- County: Clay
- Township: Perry
- Elevation: 607 ft (185 m)
- ZIP code: 47834
- FIPS code: 18-02278
- GNIS feature ID: 430282

Art is an unincorporated community in Perry Township, Clay County, Indiana. It is part of the Terre Haute Metropolitan Statistical Area.

== History ==
A post office was established at Art in 1873, and remained in operation until it was discontinued in 1903. The name Art was selected for its brevity.

== Geography ==
Art is located at 39°24′10″N 87°09′19″W.
