= Saline City, Indiana =

Saline City
- Unincorporated community
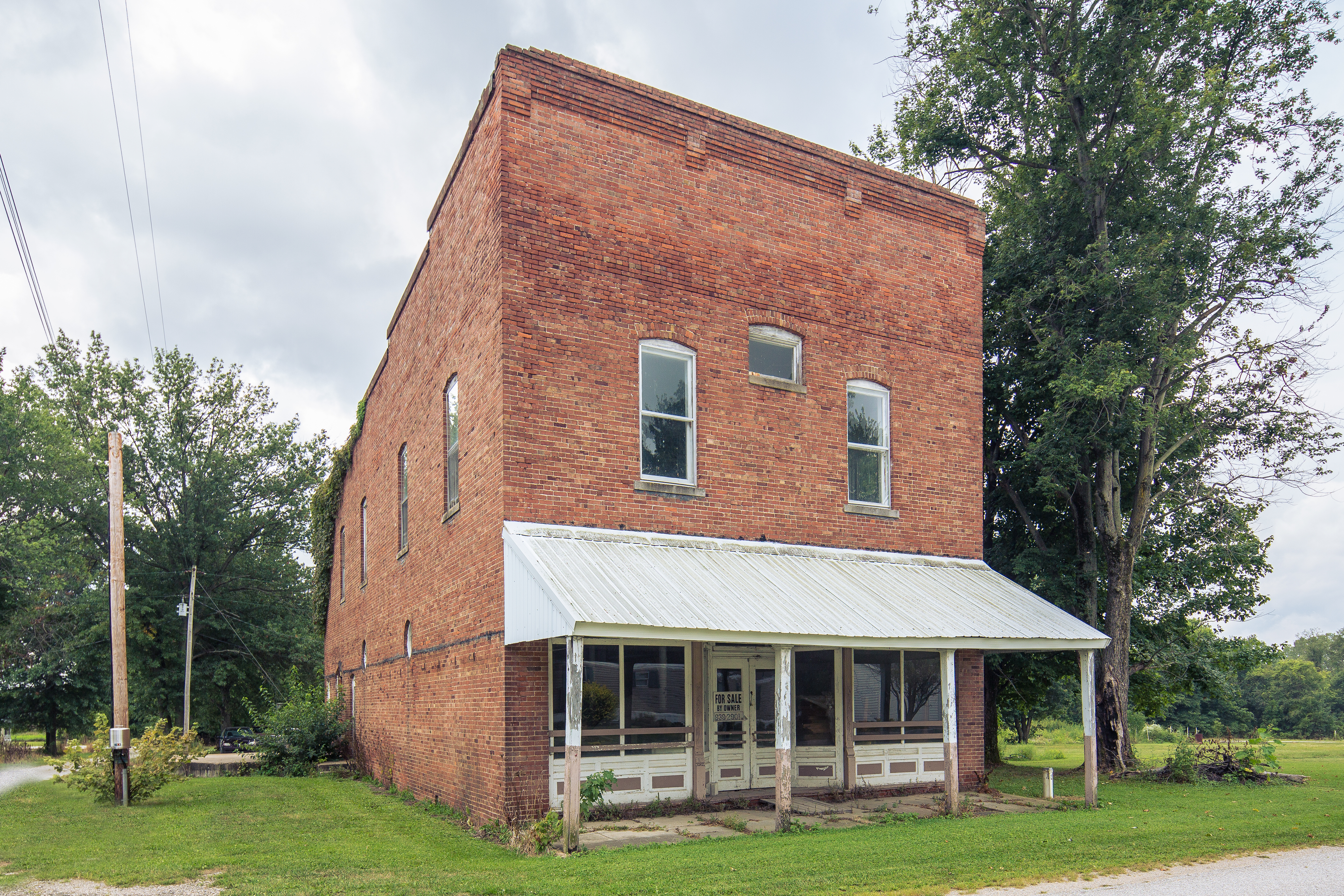

- Location in Clay County
- Coordinates: 39°21′55″N 87°07′56″W
- Country: United States
- State: Indiana
- County: Clay
- Township: Sugar Ridge
- Elevation: 571 ft (174 m)
- ZIP code: 47840
- FIPS code: 18-67518
- GNIS feature ID: 442932

Saline City is an unincorporated community in Sugar Ridge Township, Clay County, Indiana. It is part of the Terre Haute Metropolitan Statistical Area.

== History ==
Saline City had its start by the building of the railroad through that territory. A post office was established at Saline City in 1872, and remained in operation until it was discontinued in 1951. Saline likely refers to a mineral lick.

== Geography ==
Saline City is located at 39°21′55″N 87°07′56″W.

== Demographics ==
Historical population
Census	Pop.	Note	%±
2023 (est.)	12

The United States Census Bureau defined Saline City as a census designated place in the 2022 American Community Survey.
