= Perry Township, Clay County, Indiana =

Perry Township
- Township
- Location of Perry Township in Clay County
- Coordinates: 39°22′33″N 87°11′40″W
- Country: United States
- State: Indiana
- County: Clay

Government
  - Type: Indiana township

Area
  - Total: 44.65 sq mi (115.6 km^{2})
  - Land: 44.57 sq mi (115.4 km^{2})
  - Water: 0.08 sq mi (0.21 km^{2})
- Elevation: 620 ft (190 m)

Population (2020)
  - Total: 915
  - Density: 20.5/sq mi (7.93/km^{2})
- FIPS code: 18-58986
- GNIS feature ID: 453717

Perry Township is one of eleven townships in Clay County, Indiana. As of the 2020 census, its population was 915 (down from 934 at 2010) and it contained 417 housing units.

Founded in 1825 =History==

The Aqueduct Bridge and Jeffers Bridge are listed on the National Register of Historic Places.

== Geography ==
According to the 2010 census, the township has a total area of 44.65 square miles (115.6 km^{2}), of which 44.57 square miles (115.4 km^{2}) (or 99.82%) is land and 0.08 square miles (0.21 km^{2}) (or 0.18%) is water.

=== Unincorporated towns ===
- Art
- Cory
- Hickory Island

(This list is based on USGS data and may include former settlements.)

=== Adjacent townships ===
- Posey Township (north)
- Jackson Township (northeast)
- Sugar Ridge Township (east)
- Harrison Township (southeast)
- Lewis Township (south)
- Pierson Township, Vigo County (southwest)
- Riley Township, Vigo County (west)
- Lost Creek Township, Vigo County (northwest)

=== Major highways ===
- Indiana State Road 46

=== Cemeteries ===
The township contains three cemeteries: Mount Calvary, Stagg and Zion Gummere.
