= Chalybeate (disambiguation) =

Chalybeate waters are mineral spring waters containing salts of iron.

Chalybeate may also refer to:

- Chalybeate, Kentucky
- Chalybeate, Mississippi
- Chalybeate Springs, North Carolina

== See also ==
- Chalybeate Springs (disambiguation)
