= Center Point, Indiana =

- Town
- Location of Center Point in Clay County, Indiana.
- Coordinates: 39°24′57″N 87°4′36″W
- Country: United States
- State: Indiana
- County: Clay
- Township: Sugar Ridge

Area
  - Total: 0.76 sq mi (1.97 km^{2})
  - Land: 0.74 sq mi (1.92 km^{2})
  - Water: 0.023 sq mi (0.06 km^{2})
- Elevation: 660 ft (200 m)

Population (2020)
  - Total: 213
  - Density: 288/sq mi (111.1/km^{2})
- Time zone: UTC-5 (EST)
  - Summer (DST): UTC-5 (EST)
- ZIP code: 47840
- Area code: 812
- FIPS code: 18-11746
- GNIS feature ID: 0432336

Center Point is a town in Sugar Ridge Township, Clay County, Indiana, United States. As of the 2020 census, Center Point had a population of 213. It is part of the Terre Haute Metropolitan Statistical Area.

== History ==
Center Point was platted in 1856. It was named from its position near the geographical center of the county.

== Geography ==
Center Point is located at 39°24′57″N 87°4′36″W (39.415791, -87.076710).

According to the 2010 census, Center Point has a total area of 0.76 square miles (1.97 km^{2}), of which 0.74 square miles (1.92 km^{2}) (or 97.37%) is land and 0.02 square miles (0.05 km^{2}) (or 2.63%) is water. Some notable places include Center Point United Methodist Church, and a few bodies of water that lie around the town. There is an especially large body of water by North Sugar Ridge.

== Demographics ==
Historical population
Census	Pop.	Note	%±
1870	226		—
1880	295		30.5%
1890	517		75.3%
1900	600		16.1%
1910	414		−31.0%
1920	371		−10.4%
1930	372		0.3%
1940	332		−10.8%
1950	297		−10.5%
1960	268		−9.8%
1970	275		2.6%
1980	242		−12.0%
1990	278		14.9%
2000	292		5.0%
2010	242		−17.1%
2020	213		−12.0%
U.S. Decennial Census

=== 2010 census ===
As of the census of 2010, there were 242 people, 104 households, and 64 families living in the town. The population density was 327.0 inhabitants per square mile (126.3/km^{2}). There were 113 housing units at an average density of 152.7 per square mile (59.0/km^{2}). The racial makeup of the town was 98.3% White, 0.4% African American, and 1.2% Asian.

There were 104 households, of which 28.8% had children under the age of 18 living with them, 51.0% were married couples living together, 7.7% had a female householder with no husband present, 2.9% had a male householder with no wife present, and 38.5% were non-families. 32.7% of all households were made up of individuals, and 12.5% had someone living alone who was 65 years of age or older. The average household size was 2.33 and the average family size was 2.97.

The median age in the town was 40 years. 20.2% of residents were under the age of 18; 11.3% were between the ages of 18 and 24; 23.1% were from 25 to 44; 30.5% were from 45 to 64; and 14.9% were 65 years of age or older. The gender makeup of the town was 45.5% male and 54.5% female.

=== 2000 census ===
As of the census of 2000, there were 292 people, 102 households, and 78 families living in the town. The population density was 394.7 inhabitants per square mile (152.4/km^{2}). There were 115 housing units at an average density of 155.4 per square mile (60.0/km^{2}). The racial makeup of the town was 99.66% White, and 0.34% from two or more races. Hispanic or Latino of any race were 0.34% of the population.

There were 102 households, out of which 47.1% had children under the age of 18 living with them, 59.8% were married couples living together, 13.7% had a female householder with no husband present, and 23.5% were non-families. 21.6% of all households were made up of individuals, and 9.8% had someone living alone who was 65 years of age or older. The average household size was 2.86 and the average family size was 3.24.

In the town, the population was spread out, with 36.3% under the age of 18, 4.8% from 18 to 24, 28.4% from 25 to 44, 18.5% from 45 to 64, and 12.0% who were 65 years of age or older. The median age was 33 years. For every 100 females, there were 83.6 males. For every 100 females age 18 and over, there were 84.2 males.

The median income for a household in the town was $50,833, and the median income for a family was $52,917. Males had a median income of $29,844 versus $31,000 for females. The per capita income for the town was $17,110. About 4.1% of families and 6.6% of the population were below the poverty line, including 5.7% of those under the age of eighteen and 13.8% of those 65 or over.

== Notable people ==
- Ralph W. Moss (1862–1919), U.S. representative from Indiana
