= F. D. Roosevelt State Park =

- Pine Mountain State Park
- U.S. National Register of Historic Places
- U.S. National Historic Landmark District
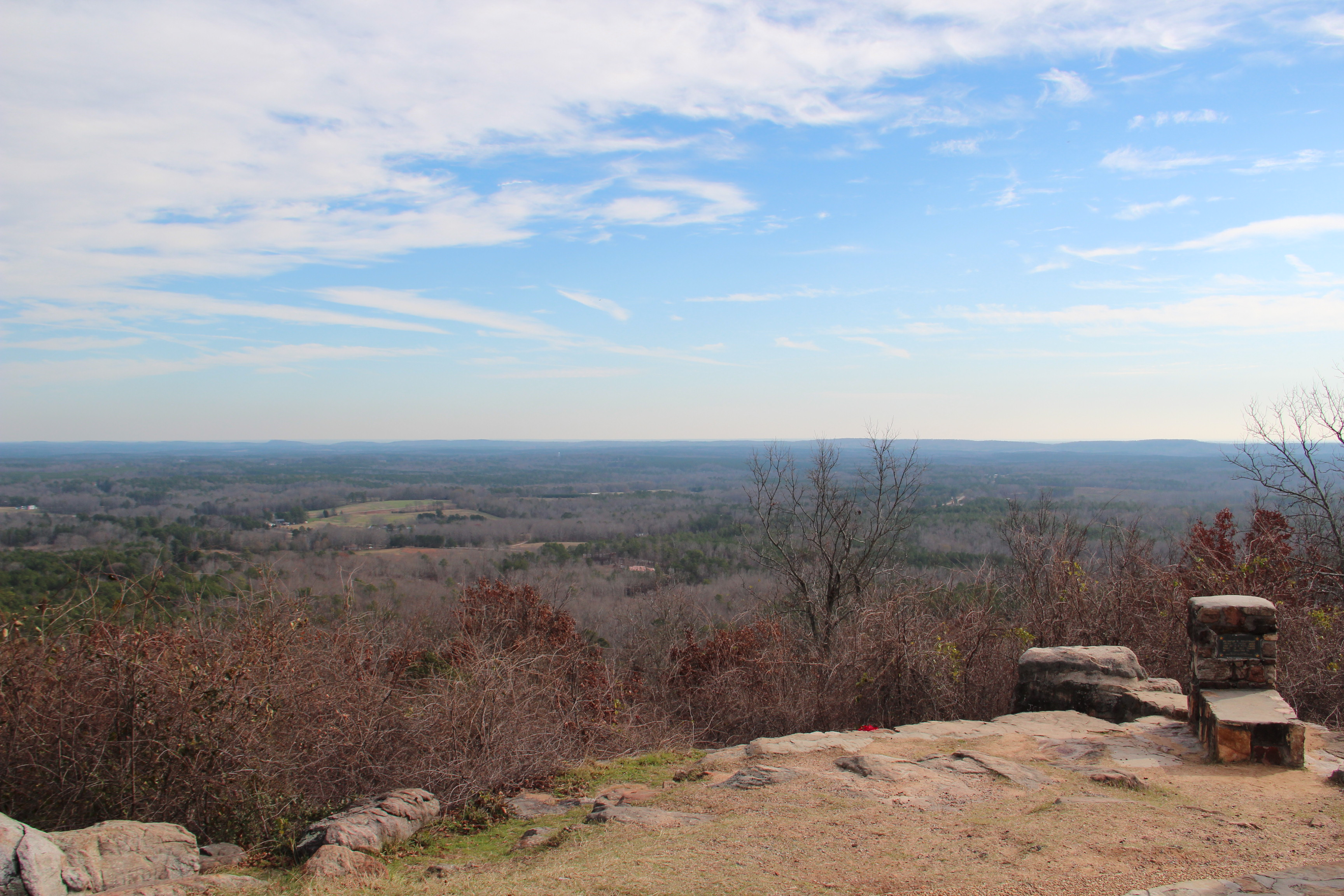
- View from Dowdell's Knob

- Location within Georgia Location within the United States
- Nearest city: Pine Mountain, Georgia
- Coordinates: 32°49′55″N 84°48′29″W
- Area: 4,568 acres (1,849 ha) (landmarked area)
- Built: 1934
- Architectural style: Bungalow/Craftsman
- NRHP reference No.: 97001273

Significant dates
- Added to NRHP: September 25, 1997
- Designated NHLD: September 25, 1997

F.D. Roosevelt State Park is a 9,049 acres (36.62 km^{2}) Georgia state park located near Pine Mountain and Warm Springs. The park is named for former U.S. President Franklin Delano Roosevelt, who sought a treatment for his paralytic illness in nearby Warm Springs at the Little White House. The park is located along the Pine Mountain Range. The western portion of the park, formerly named Pine Mountain State Park, was named a National Historic Landmark in 1997. F.D. Roosevelt State Park is Georgia's largest state park.

Several structures in the park were built by the Civilian Conservation Corps (CCC) in the Great Depression, including a stone swimming pool and Roosevelt's favorite picnic spot at Dowdell's Knob, overlooking the valley below. President Roosevelt would take polio patients with depression along on picnics at Dowdell's Knob.

== History ==
The region containing the modern-day park was inhabited by the Creek Nation until ceded under the Treaties of 1825 and 1826, which granted the territories between the Flint and Chattahoochee rivers to the State of Georgia. An influx of settlers established the town of Kings Gap, named after King's Trading Post located near the modern-day Liberty Bell Pool. The town eventually vanished by the 20th century.

In 1924, Franklin Delano Roosevelt first visited the warm springs located near the towns of Warm Springs and Bullochville. He came to the springs seeking relief from the symptoms of the paralytic illness he had contracted three years earlier. In 1927, Roosevelt and others established the Warm Springs Foundation, later known as the Warm Springs Institute for Rehabilitation, which established therapeutic programs utilizing the area's mineral springs. Since then, the institute has developed into a complex of facilities helping those with disabilities.

Just prior to being elected president of the United States in 1932, Roosevelt built a residence nearby which would come to be known as the Little White House. After his election to the presidency, he spearheaded the establishment of the Civilian Conservation Corps (CCC). It was this organization which, in 1935, established a camp near the modern-day park entrance on Highway 354. From this camp, the young men of the CCC constructed much of the present state park, including the Liberty Bell Pool, the Roosevelt Lodge, several cabins, the 15-acre (61,000 m^{2}) Lake Delanor and its companion, the 25-acre (100,000 m^{2}) Lake Franklin. Because of the well-preserved CCC design, layout, and buildings of the western half of the park, and for its association with Roosevelt, the area was designated a National Historic Landmark District in 1997.

== Geology and geography ==
F.D. Roosevelt State Park is Georgia's largest state park. The park is located on the Pine Mountain Ridge, which is Georgia's southernmost mountainous area (and the southernmost mountainous area in the United States east of the Mississippi River). The Pine Mountain Ridge, which extends into Alabama, is composed of quartzite rock formations. It is geologically a feature of the Piedmont Plateau, not the Appalachian Mountains farther north.

Dowdell's Knob is the highest point in F. D. Roosevelt State Park, at 1,395 feet. The knob was named for two pioneer Harris County settlers: Lewis & James Dowdell.

The park contains the 23-mile (37 km) long Pine Mountain Trail, a scenic nature path that winds through both hardwood and pine forests, featuring hickory and several species of oak; forest undergrowth includes buckeye, pawpaw, azalea, blueberry and huckleberry. The trail has twenty one primitive back country campsites for backpackers. The Pine Mountain Trail is wholly maintained by the volunteers of the Pine Mountain Trail Association. In addition, the park contains two stocked fishing lakes and a historic trading post. There is a clump of surviving resistant chestnut trees in the park.

== Recent events ==
On April 12, 2007, the 62nd anniversary of Roosevelt's death, a 1,200-pound bronze statue was unveiled at Dowdell's Knob. The statue depicts Roosevelt sitting on his removable car seat and wearing his leg braces. The statue, commissioned by the Georgia Department of Natural Resources, was created by Atlanta sculptor Martin Dawe.

During the 2011 Super Outbreak, an EF2 tornado caused severe damage to the park, especially in the campgrounds. It was estimated that 30% of the structures in one of the park's group campground areas were destroyed.

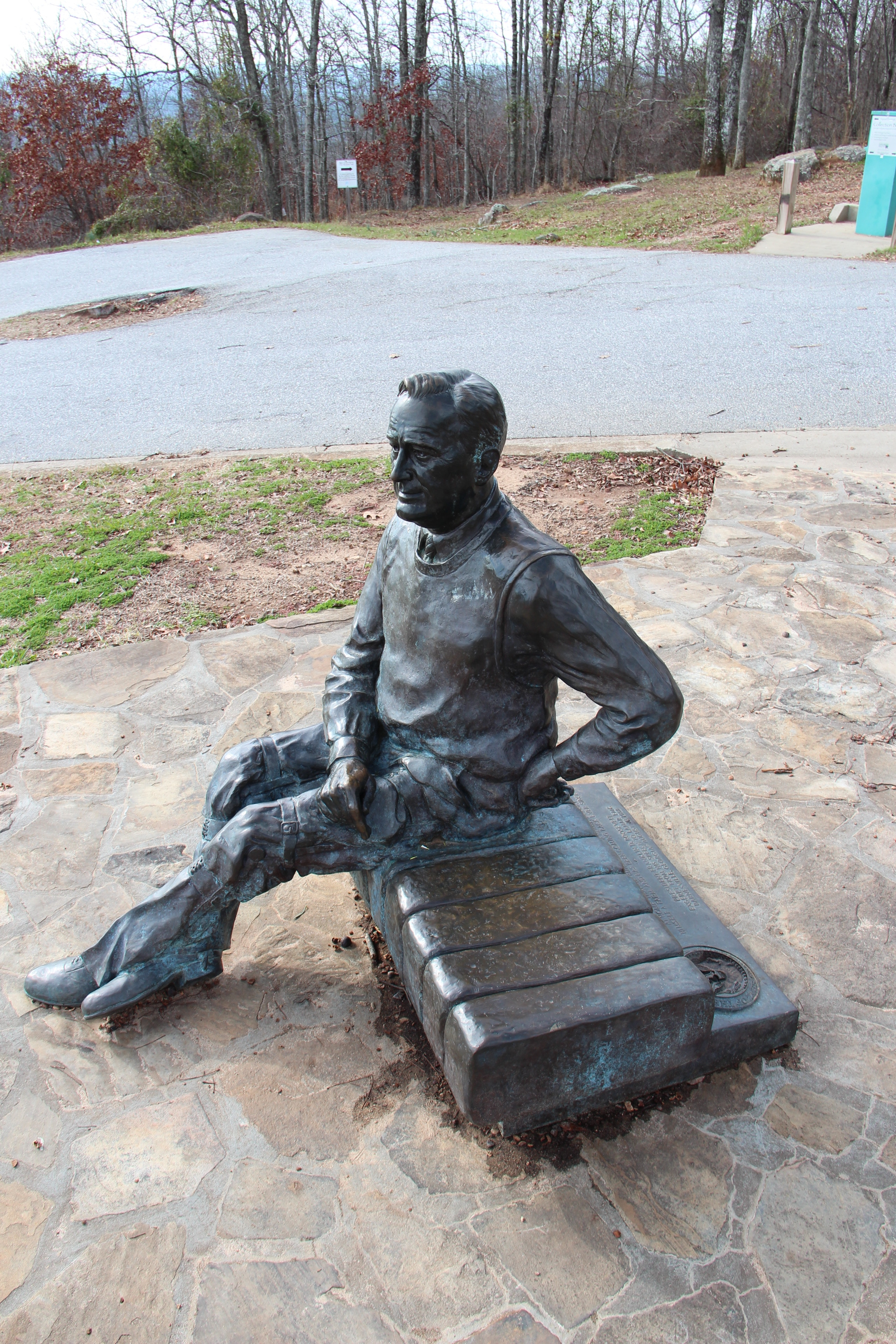
F.D. Roosevelt's statue at Dowdell's Knob.

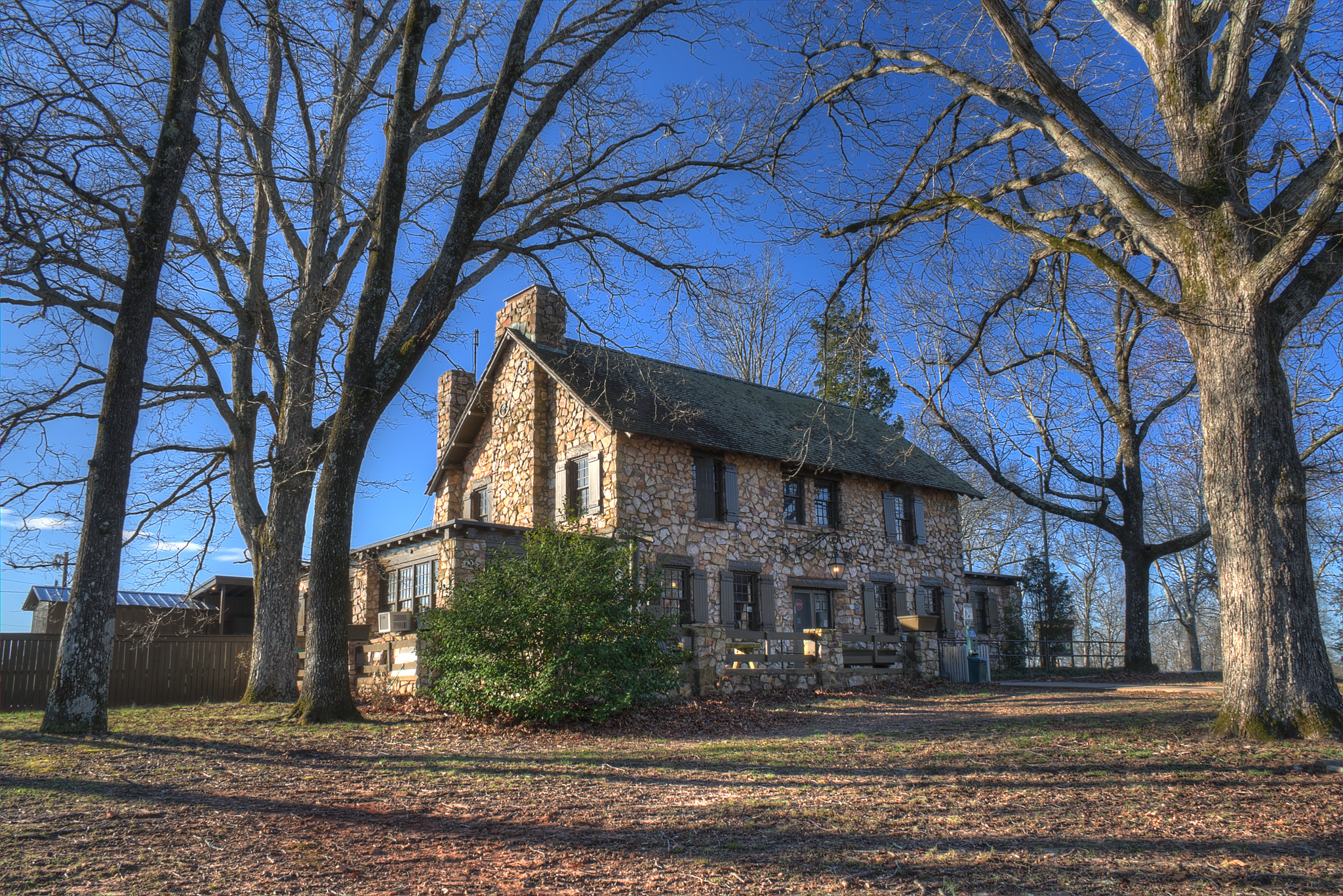
Visitor Center

== Facilities ==
- 105 Tent/Trailer/RV Campsites
- 21 Backcountry Campsites as of 2024
- 22 Cottages
- 2 Picnic Shelters
- 2 Group Camps
- 1 Group Shelter
- 1 Pioneer Campground
- 1 Public Swimming Pool

== Annual events ==
- Spring Backpacking Trip (March) (obsolete)

== See also ==
- Roosevelt Warm Springs Institute for Rehabilitation
- Franklin D. Roosevelt's paralytic illness
- List of National Historic Landmarks in Georgia (U.S. state)
- National Register of Historic Places listings in Harris County, Georgia
