= Pine Mountain Observatory =

Observatory in Oregon, US

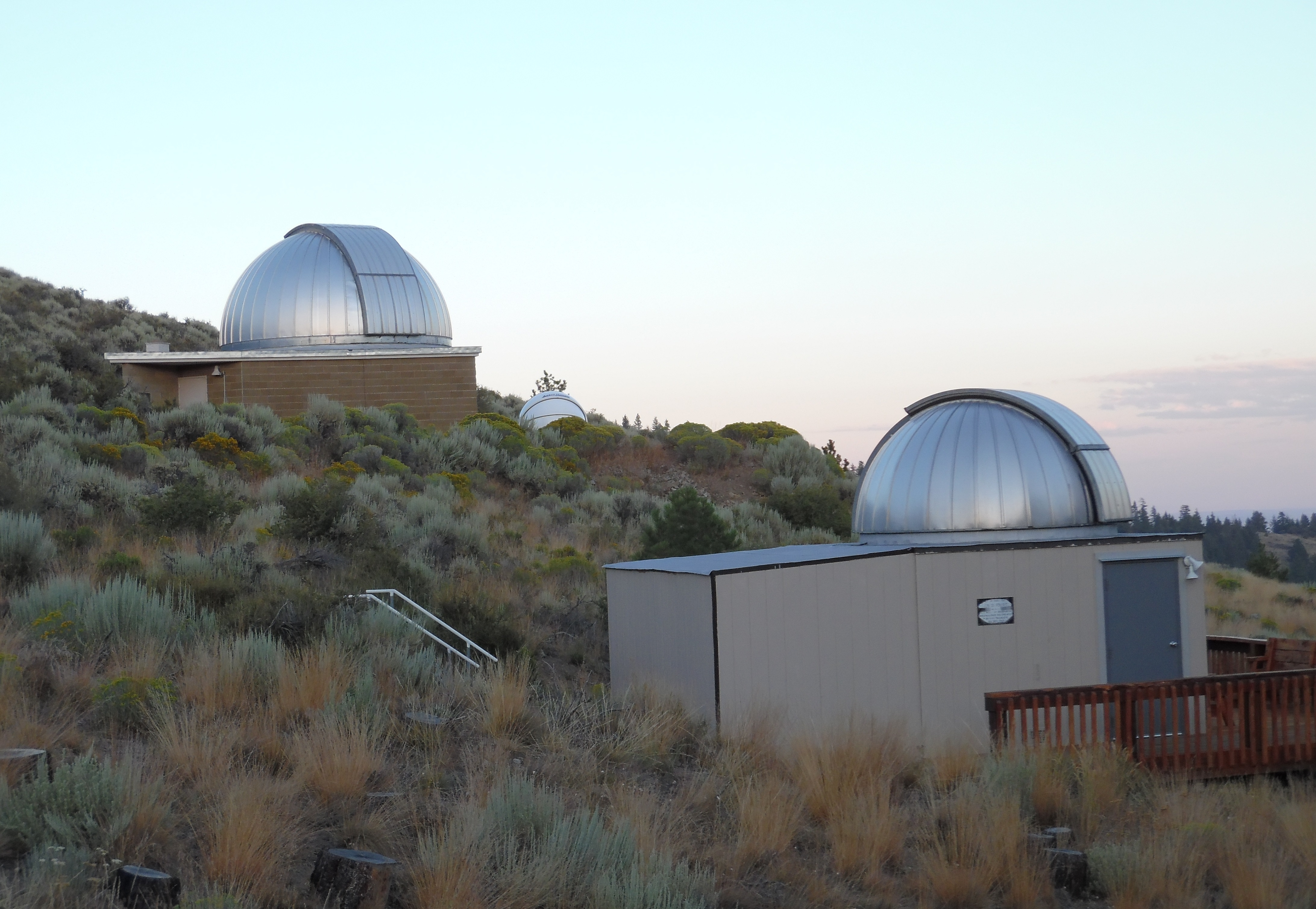
- Telescope domes at Pine Mountain
- Organization: University of Oregon
- Location: near Bend, Oregon
- Coordinates: 43.7915°N 120.9408°W
- Altitude: 1,920 meters (6,300 ft)
- Weather: PMO Weather Station
- Established: 1967
- Website: Pine Mountain Observatory
- Related media on Commons

Pine Mountain Observatory (PMO) is an astronomical observatory operated by the University of Oregon Department of Physics under a special use permit from the Deschutes National Forest. The facility is located 26 miles (42 km) southeast of Bend, Oregon (USA) near the summit of Pine Mountain.

PMO supports a wide variety of programs with an emphasis on projects that allow undergraduate students to be involved with many aspects of facility operations. PMO also has robust programs centered on K-12 education and public outreach.

The site was discovered and characterized by professors Russ Donnelly and E.G. Ebbinghausen in 1965 when they determined that the sky conditions were excellent and worthy of an observatory being built on Pine Mountain. The first telescope became operational in 1967.

Former programs gave high-school students the opportunity to not only observe at PMO, but also analyze data and prepare of a paper for publication. Early programs at PMO helped develop older software programs that allowed K-12 teachers to perform observations remotely and process the data for classroom use.

Past research projects included research on white dwarf stars and examining the large-scale structure of galaxies.

== Telescopes ==
=== Planewave 14" Telescope ===
The Planewave 14” Corrected Dall-Kirkham telescope and dome are the newest on the Mountain. Construction on the site started in 2015 and the entire system was commissioned over the next two summer seasons, and in Fall 2018 the Planewave started observations. Unlike the other telescopes at PMO, the Planewave 14” has never been used for naked-eye observing by humans. Instead, it uses a very sophisticated camera system to capture the light that you would normally see through the eyepiece and records it as data in a computer. One advantage of having a completely computer controlled telescope is that it can be operated from remote locations - like the University of Oregon campus in Eugene. This telescope, named 'the Robbins' after contributor Kenneth C. Robins, will soon be operated from locations far from PMO by students and researchers from UO and other educational institutions. Because of its special nature this telescope is not often used for public outreach, rather, it is mainly operated by students conducting undergraduate research. This is to prepare them for research as graduate students in physics or astronomy and future technical careers. Even though this 14" telescope is smaller than the others at PMO, it is one of the most powerful instruments at the observatory due to its start-of-the-art optics, electronics, and camera system. PMO scientists routinely use the Robbins to observe a myriad of astronomical targets, from nearby asteroids and comets to clusters of galaxies.

=== Fecker 15" Telescope ===
The Fecker 15” Cassegrain telescope is often referred to as the “Matriarch of the Mountain” because of its long, rich history and importance in the development of PMO. In 1950 the telescope was purchased by the University of Oregon and placed atop the science building in Eugene until 1961. At that time Dr. E.G. Ebenhausen of the physics department took the Fecker to Cache Mountain near Sisters, Oregon to conduct an atmospheric feasibility study. The positive results from that survey led to the construction of PMO. In the earliest days of PMO the Observatory received a grant to construct a dome for the Fecker, and the 'Grand Old Lady' saw its first light in the spring of 1968! Unfortunately, by the 1990s the Fecker had fallen into deep disrepair. It was not until 2012 that the Head of Operations Alton Luken (a PMO volunteer at the time) found the telescope under a shelf behind rolls of insulation. Luken spent the next 3 years fully restoring the Fecker to her former glory. The telescope was then re-installed in a dome in summer 2015 and the Fecker has acted as an invaluable tool for UO Physics students to develop their science communication skills and for the public to learn more about the universe.

=== Boller & Chivens 24" Telescope ===
Completed in summer 1967, the Boller & Chivens 24” dome was the first building constructed at PMO after a special use permit from the Deschutes National Forest was granted. In August 1967 the telescope was installed and the grand opening of PMO was held on September 17, 1967. That same night, the telescope saw its first light! Throughout the 1970s and 1980s the Boller & Chivens 24" was active in cutting-edge astronomy research. In fact, in 1970 this telescope made the very first observation of a class of star that would come to be known as magnetars. Since its heyday in the 70's and 80's the Boller & Chivens continues to be one of the most important telescopes at PMO. Currently it is being used for undergraduate research projects, technology development, and for public outreach events.

=== Sigma 32" Telescope ===
The Sigma 32" telescope and its massive dome came to PMO as part of an expansion of the facility in the late 1970s. Installed in 1978, this telescope has been one of the largest telescopes in the Pacific Northwest for many years! The Sigma was a research active telescope through the mid-1990s. During this time period it was used by astronomers from UO as well as other universities as a general purpose telescope where it observed many kinds of celestial objects, from nearby comets to galaxies strewn across the Universe. Unfortunately, around the year 2000 the Sigma suffered a catastrophic failure of its primary motor drive. Due to the unique nature of the telescope design (among only 5 ever built) it has not been possible to repair or replace the custom parts required to bring it back into operation. For now, the Sigma rests in its dome, waiting for the opportunity to once again scan the skies. These days this dome is home to the Control Room for the Planewave 14" telescope. The dome is also used as a meeting place for visiting groups as well as a venue for lectures and classes given by PMO staff.

== Research ==
The Robbins and the 0.6 m (24 in) are both being used for research.

The Asteroid Light-Curve research project is currently underway. In this project, students are tasked with observing asteroids throughout the night. Once this is done, the students take the data and create light-curves. Using the newly create light-curves, the data is further analyzed until a 3-D shape of the asteroid can be generated.

== Projects ==
Pine Mountain Observatory Pipeline (PMOP): A Python script that takes data from the Robins telescope stored as FITS files and reduces and organizes the images.

Coming soon: The Solar Telescope Project. This new telescope will be operating within 2021.

== Outreach ==
Pine Mountain Observatory is open to the public every weekend from Memorial Day till the last weekend of September.

Pine Mountain Observatory is currently partnered with Kobe University. Together, the two are working to observe and identify asteroids. To do this, the two are observing the same asteroids concatenated, then creating light-curves based on the data from the telescopes. This data is then modified to create a 3-D model.

Pine Mountain Observatory occasionally invites students from the Society of Physics Students (SPS) at the University of Oregon to come stay in the Pine Mountain dorms and observe late into the night.

Pine Mountain Observatory works in partnership each summer with Girl Scouts, as well. This partnership is meant to allow high school aged students the opportunity to talk with current students researching at the observatory, while also allowing the Girl Scouts the opportunity to observe through the telescopes themselves. This program has the scouts camp at the Deschutes National Forest, the campground is located only a few feet away from the Observatory itself.

== See also ==
- List of astronomical observatories
