= Pine Mountain (Oregon) =

Mountain in Oregon

Highest point
- Elevation: 6,509 feet (1,984 m)
- Coordinates: 43°48′11″N 120°54′48″W

Geography
- Location: Deschutes, Oregon, U.S.
- Topo map: USGS Pine Mountain

Geology
- Rock age: 6.25 Ma
- Mountain type: Pyroclastic cone

Pine Mountain is a rhyolitic mountain east of Bend and south of U.S. Route 20 (US 20) in eastern Deschutes County, Oregon, United States. It is the site of an astronomical observatory called the Pine Mountain Observatory. The mountain is a part of the Deschutes Formation (which is related to Cascade volcanism) and is the southeasternmost exposure of the formation and is of similar age to Cline Buttes. Pine Mountain is also well known for its spectacular "glass off" weather conditions which are ideal for paragliding.

== Geology ==
Pine Mountain shows considerable erosion and is covered with thick soil deposits. The mountain consists of basalt, rhyolite, andesite and dacite. Dunes mark the northwest flank of the mountain, consisting of pumiceous dust and lapilli.

== Trivia ==
On September 17, 1984 a large fireball was seen from the Pine Mountain Observatory heading northeasterly before breaking into six orange fragments.
