= Cory, Indiana =

Cory
- Unincorporated community
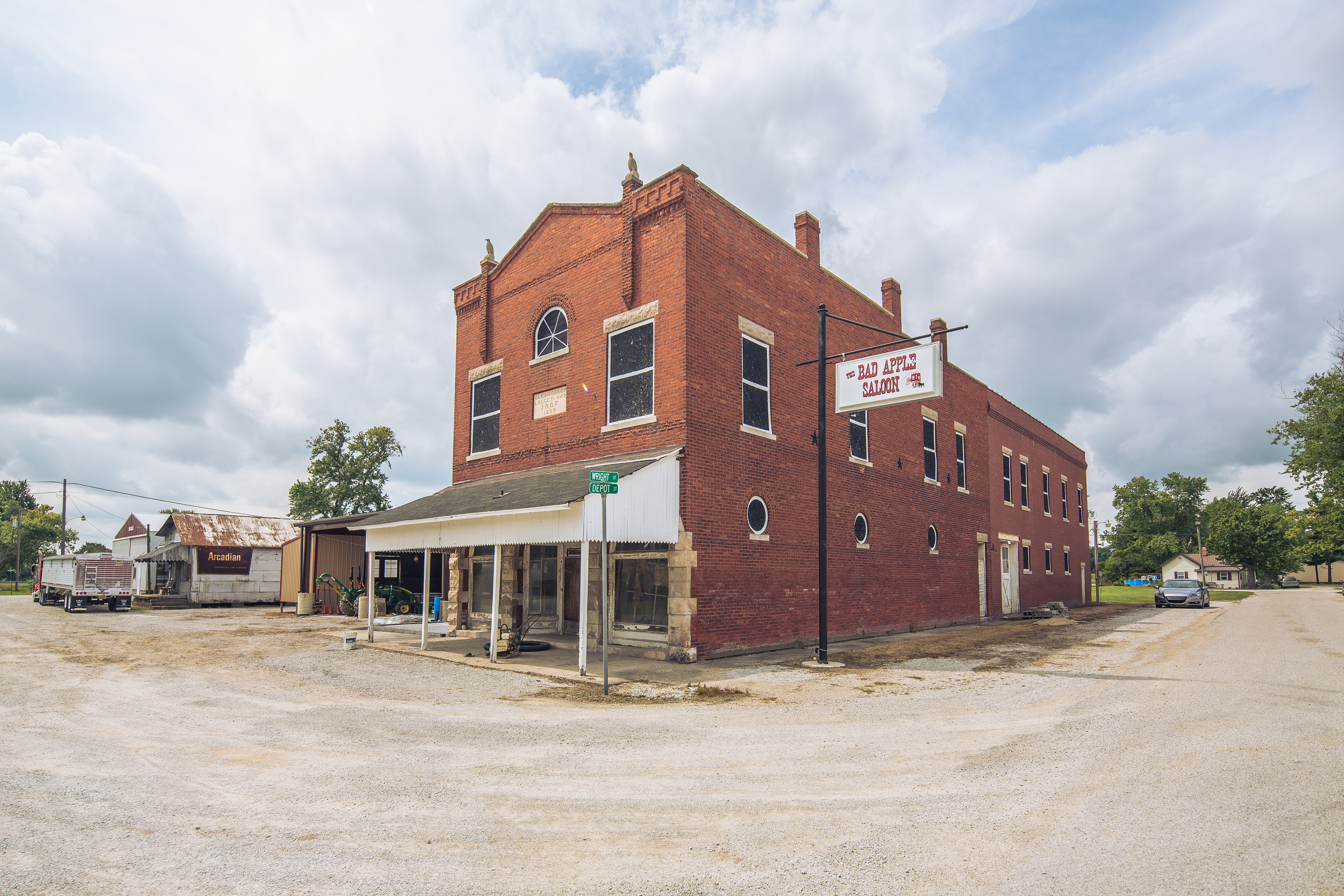

- Location in Clay County
- Coordinates: 39°22′56″N 87°12′21″W
- Country: United States
- State: Indiana
- County: Clay
- Township: Perry
- Elevation: 630 ft (190 m)
- Time zone: UTC-5 (Eastern (EST))
  - Summer (DST): UTC-4 (EDT)
- ZIP code: 47846
- FIPS code: 18-15238
- GNIS feature ID: 432999

Cory is an unincorporated community in Perry Township, Clay County, Indiana. It is part of the Terre Haute Metropolitan Statistical Area. Cory hosts the annual Cory Apple Festival.

== History ==
Cory was platted in 1872. It was named for Simeon Cory, an area businessman. At one time there were 3 taverns in Cory.

== Geography ==
Cory is located at 39°22′56″N 87°12′21″W.

== Demographics ==
The United States Census Bureau delineated Cory as a census designated place in the 2022 American Community Survey.
