= Pine Mountain (Missouri) =

Summit in the US state of Missouri

Coordinates: 37°43′16″N 90°36′00″W

Pine Mountain is a summit in St. Francois County in the U.S. state of Missouri. The summit has an elevation of 1,499 feet (457 m). The mountain is about 3.5 miles (5.6 km) south of Bismarck along Missouri Route N. The peak rises just south of the confluence of Indian Creek with the St. Francis River.

Pine Mountain was so named after the large number of pine trees on its summit.
