= Sugar Ridge Township, Clay County, Indiana =

Sugar Ridge Township
- Township
- Location of Sugar Ridge Township in Clay County
- Coordinates: 39°22′36″N 87°06′05″W
- Country: United States
- State: Indiana
- County: Clay

Government
  - Type: Indiana township

Area
  - Total: 28.21 sq mi (73.1 km^{2})
  - Land: 27.72 sq mi (71.8 km^{2})
  - Water: 0.5 sq mi (1.3 km^{2})
- Elevation: 581 ft (177 m)

Population (2020)
  - Total: 914
  - Density: 33.0/sq mi (12.7/km^{2})
- FIPS code: 18-73988
- GNIS feature ID: 453887

Sugar Ridge Township is one of eleven townships in Clay County, Indiana. As of the 2020 census, its population was 914 (down from 939 at 2010) and it contained 438 housing units.

== History ==
Sugar Ridge Township organized in 1854. It was named from a high ridge passing through its central portion.

The Aqueduct Bridge, Feeder Dam Bridge, and Jeffers Bridge are listed on the National Register of Historic Places.

== Geography ==
According to the 2010 census, the township has a total area of 28.21 square miles (73.1 km^{2}), of which 27.72 square miles (71.8 km^{2}) (or 98.26%) is land and 0.5 square miles (1.3 km^{2}) (or 1.77%) is water. Dietz Lake is in this township.

=== Cities and towns ===
- Center Point

=== Unincorporated towns ===
- Ashboro
- Saline City

(This list is based on USGS data and may include former settlements.)

=== Adjacent townships ===
- Jackson Township (north)
- Washington Township (east)
- Marion Township, Owen County (southeast)
- Harrison Township (south)
- Perry Township (west)
- Posey Township (northwest)

=== Major highways ===
- Indiana State Road 46
- Indiana State Road 59

=== Cemeteries ===
The township contains three cemeteries: Gremes, Harris and Moss.
