= Dowdell's Knob =

Mountain in Georgia, United States

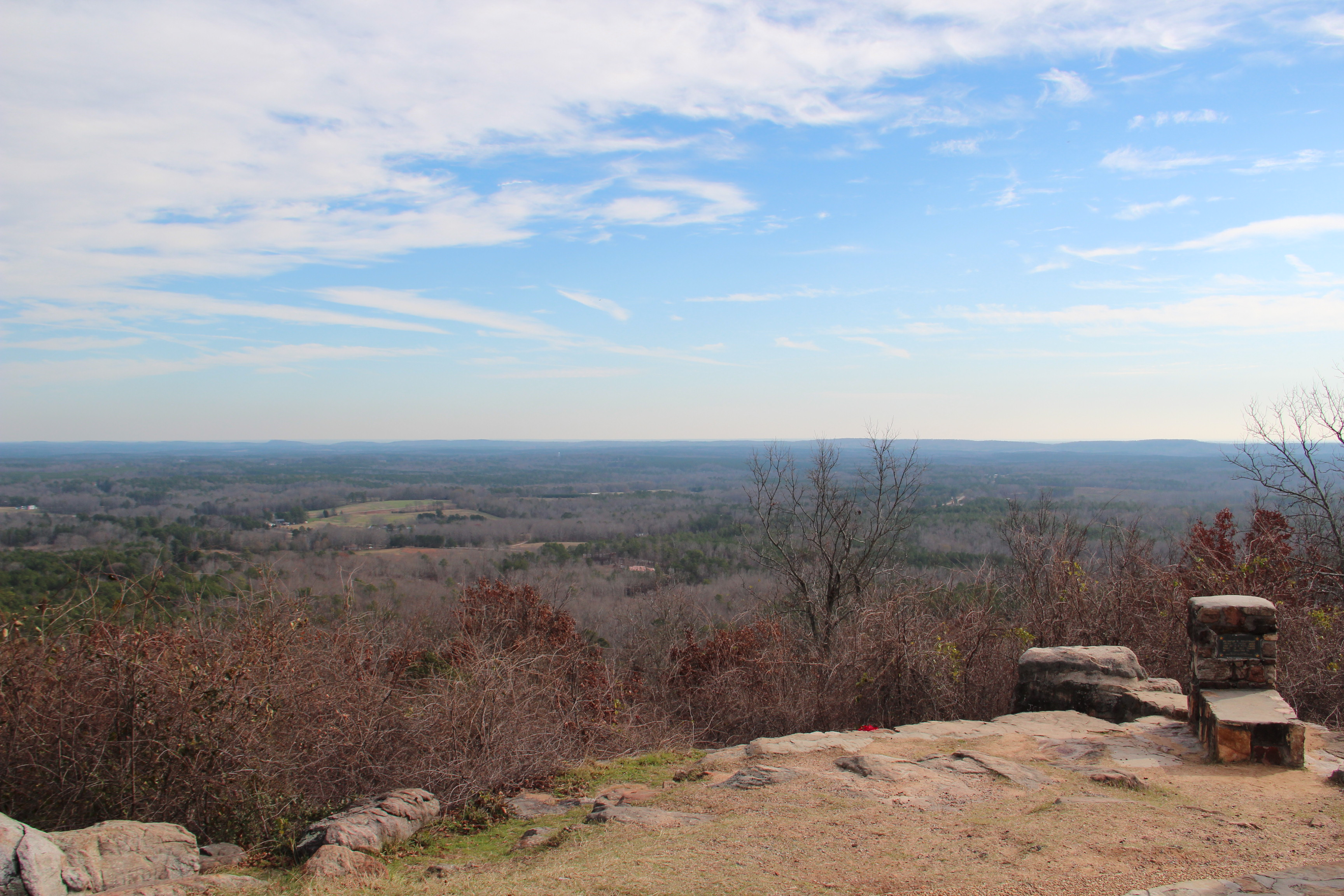
- View from the top of the mountain

Highest point
- Elevation: 1,395 ft (425 m)
- Prominence: 495 ft (151 m)
- Coordinates: 32°50′26″N 84°44′45″W

Geography
- Location within Georgia
- Location: Shiloh, Georgia
- Parent range: Pine Mountain Range
- Topo map: USGS Shiloh

Climbing
- First ascent: 1932
- Easiest route: Georgia State Route 190

Dowdell's Knob is a prominent mountain in Harris County, Georgia. It is the highest point in Harris County at 1,395 feet (425 meters) above sea level and the highest point on the Pine Mountain Range in the area. It is often referred to as a historical spot where former U.S. President Franklin D. Roosevelt would dine occasionally. He had a brick oven and picnic area constructed on this mountain for his use during his visits to nearby Warm Springs. Dowdell's Knob is located 66 mi (106 km) south of Atlanta and 30 mi (48 km) north of Columbus. Latitudinally, it is the southernmost mountain in the Southeastern United States east of the Mississippi River.

The summit has the name of James and Lewis Dowdell, early settlers.

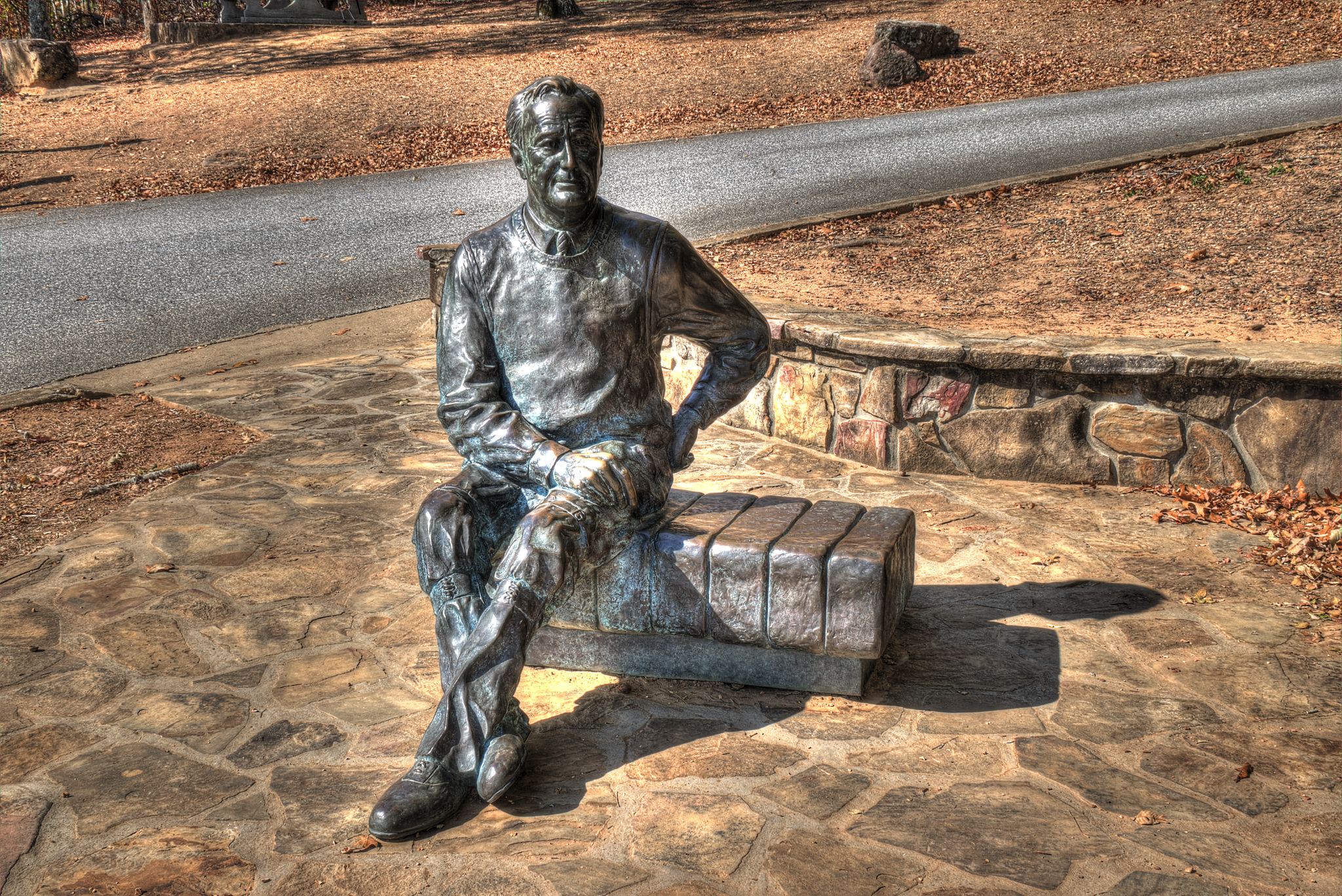
bronze statue of Franklin D. Roosevelt

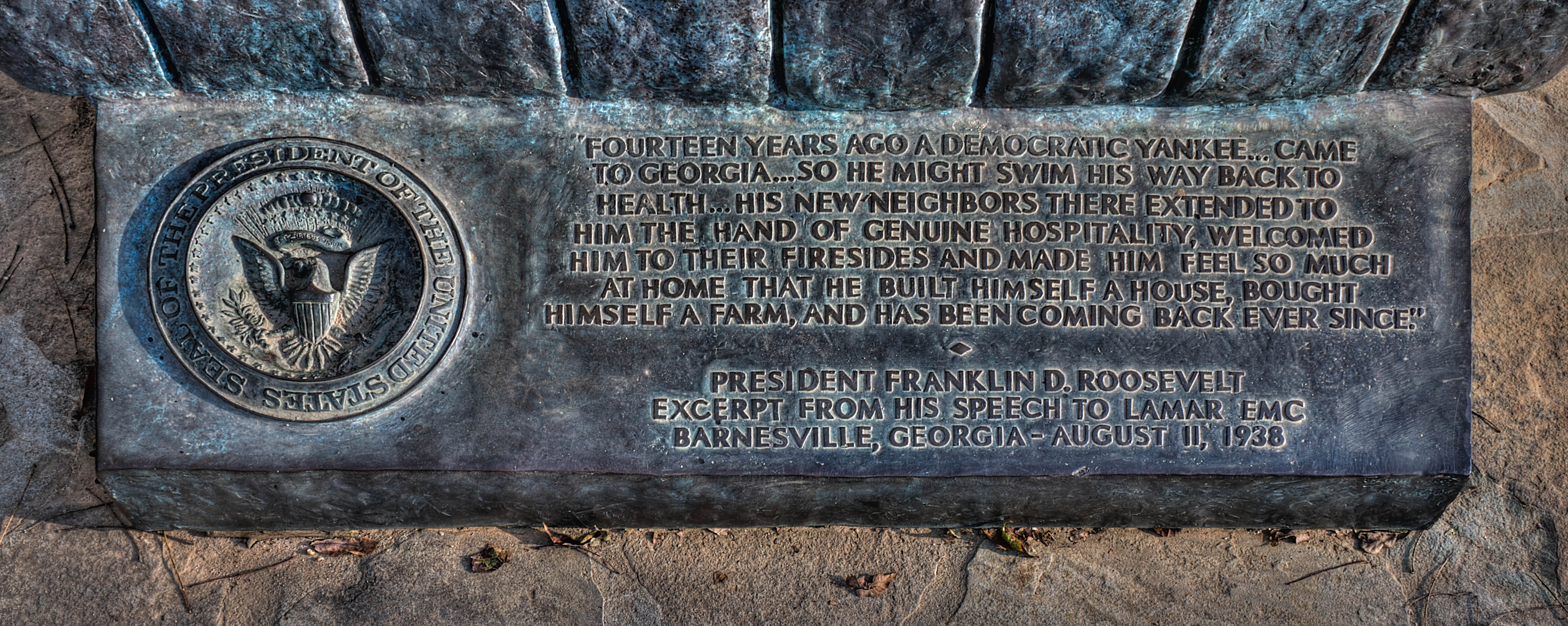
detail of statue

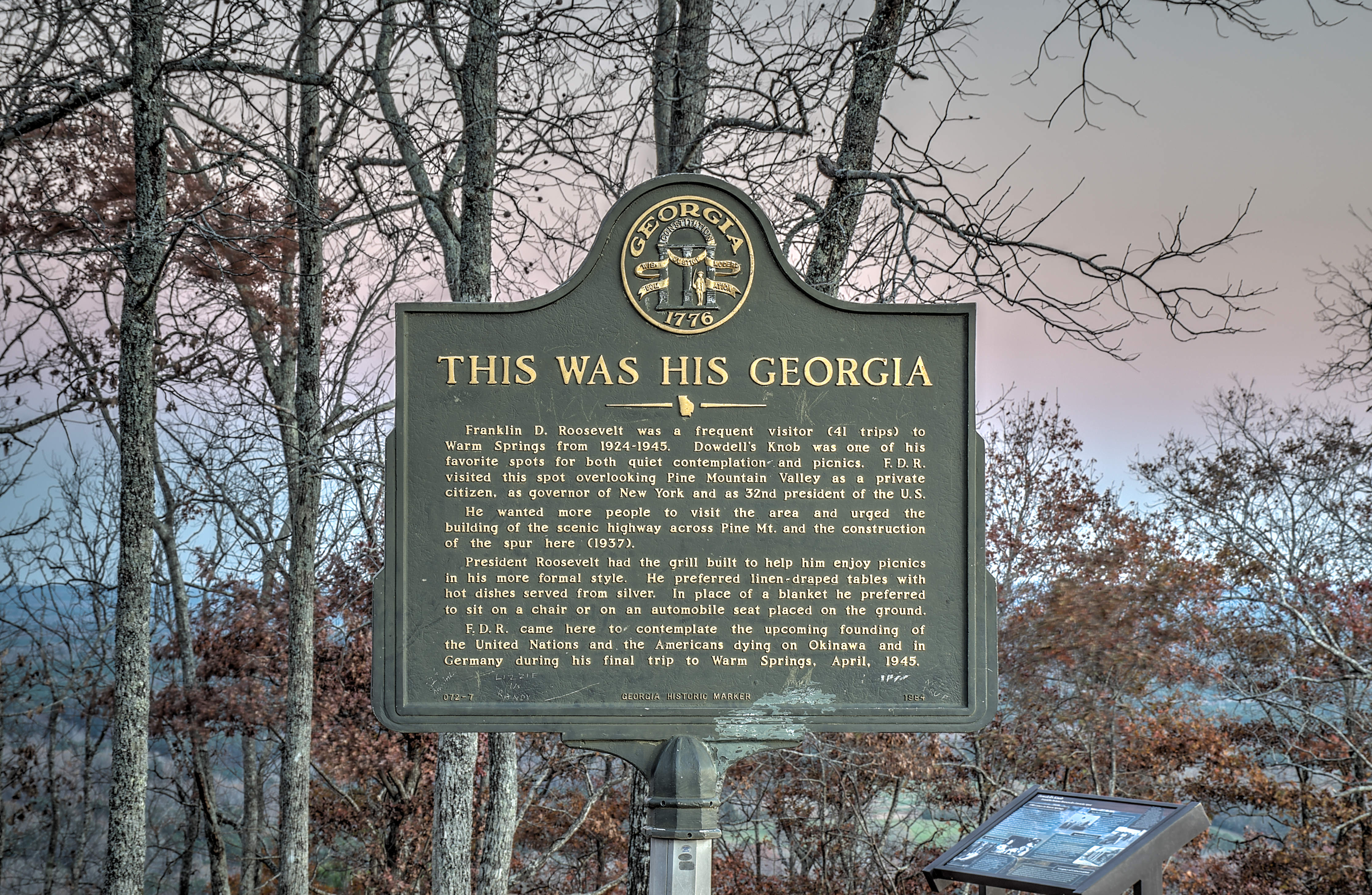
historical marker

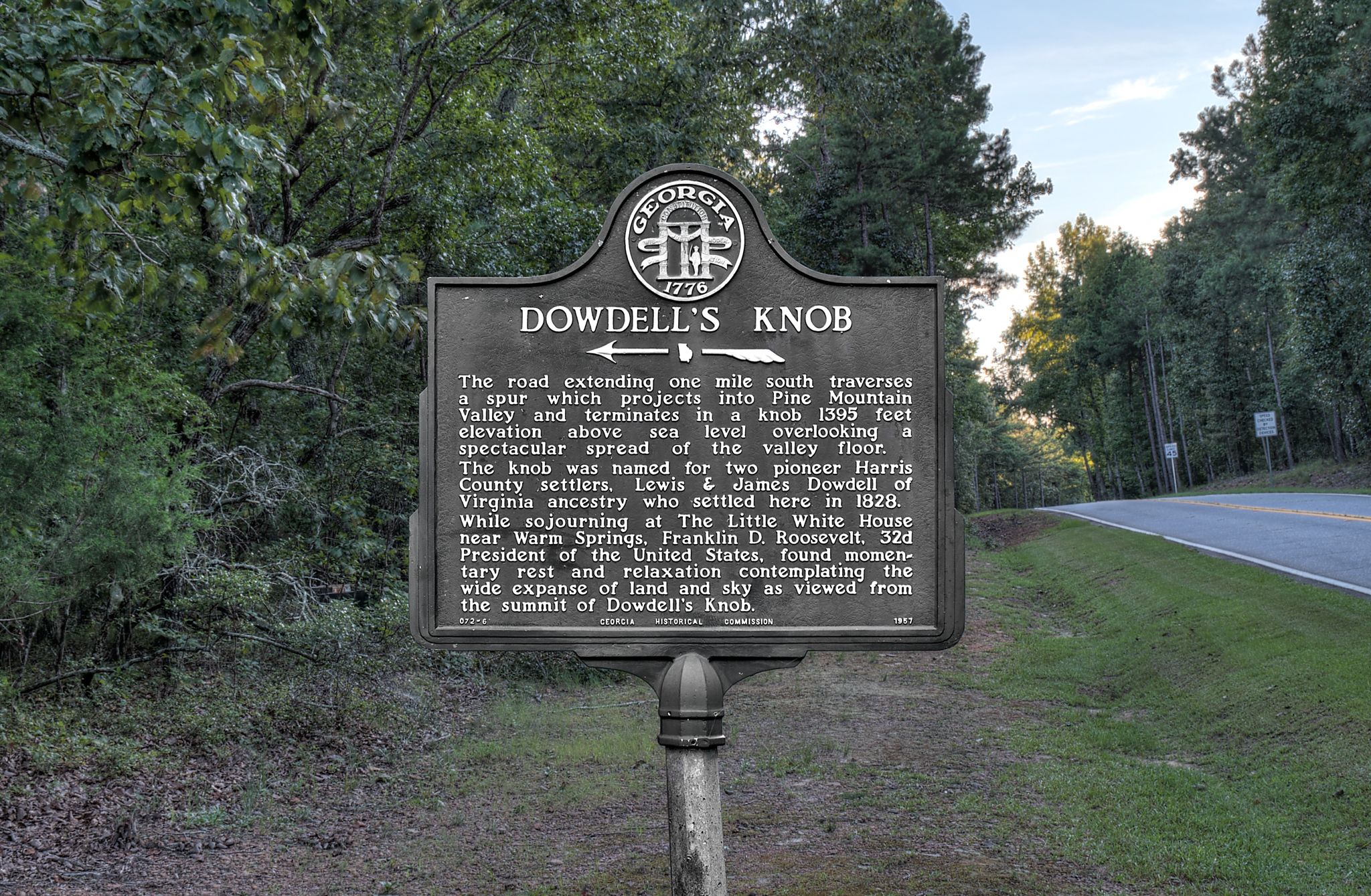
historical marker
