= Ashboro, Indiana =

Ashboro
- Unincorporated community
- Location within Clay County, Indiana
- Coordinates: 39°23′56″N 87°06′21″W
- Country: United States
- State: Indiana
- County: Clay
- Township: Sugar Ridge
- Elevation: 610 ft (190 m)
- ZIP code: 47840
- FIPS code: 18-02332
- GNIS feature ID: 449615

Ashboro is an unincorporated community in Sugar Ridge Township, Clay County, Indiana. It is part of the Terre Haute Metropolitan Statistical Area.

== History ==
Ashboro was founded in 1858. It was named after Asheboro, North Carolina.

A post office was established at Ashboro in 1858, and remained in operation until it was discontinued in 1918. The post office was officially spelled Ashborough in early years.

== Geography ==
Ashboro is located at 39°23′56″N 87°06′21″W.
