= Chalybeate Springs, Georgia =

Unincorporated community in Georgia, U.S.

Coordinates: 32°51′24″N 84°34′49″W

Chalybeate Springs is an unincorporated community in Meriwether County, in the U.S. state of Georgia.

== History ==
The first settlement at Chalybeate Springs was made in the 1830s. The community was named for a chalybeate-impregnated mineral spring near the original town site. A variant name is "Chalybeate". A post office called Chalybeate Springs was established in 1860, the name was changed to Chalybeate in 1895, and the post office closed in 1929. The Georgia General Assembly incorporated the place in 1907 as the "Town of Chalybeate Springs". The town's municipal charter was dissolved in 1995.
