= Pine Mountain Range =

Mountain ridge in Georgia, United States

Coordinates: 32°50′15″N 84°48′56″W

- Pine Mountain
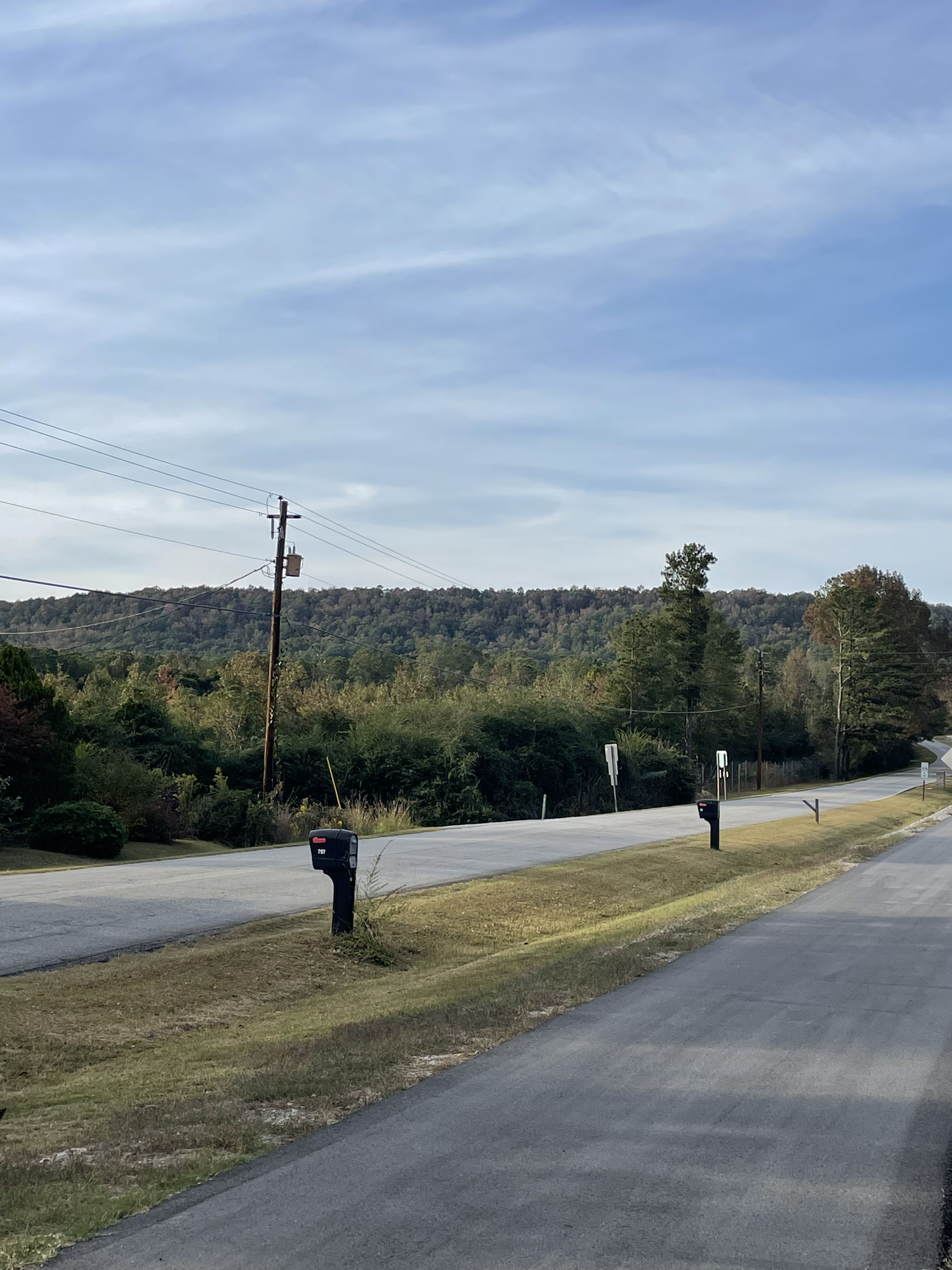
- Looking at the Pine Mountain Range, northwest of Hamilton.

Highest point
- Peak: Dowdell's Knob
- Elevation: 1,395 ft (425 m)

Dimensions
- Length: 50 mi (80 km)

Geography
- Country: United States
- Region: Southern Rivers to Piedmont area of Georgia

The Pine Mountain Range is a long ridge in Meriwether County, Georgia, Harris County, Georgia, and Talbot County, Georgia. The highest altitudes in all three of these west Georgia counties can be found along the range.

The Pine Mountain Range is part of a larger geological feature known as the Pine Mountain terrane, which extends into eastern Alabama. The ridge in Georgia exceeds 1,100 feet (340 m) in elevation for a distance of about 20 miles (32 km). These are the highest elevations at so southerly a latitude in the eastern half of the continental United States. (The entire Pine Mountain terrane is geologically distinct from the Appalachian Range, which terminates farther north in Georgia and Alabama and has its own Pine Mountain in Kentucky and Tennessee.)

The Pine Mountain Range begins around Lake Harding, and runs northeast through Harris County. U.S. Route 27, as well as Georgia State Routes 190 and 354, cross the ridge south and east of the city of Pine Mountain. The ridge then parallels the Harris-Meriwether County line, where the highest point on the range, 1,395-foot (425 m) Dowdell's Knob, is found. President Franklin D. Roosevelt had a brick oven and picnic area constructed at this location for use during his many stays at his house in nearby Warm Springs. It then parallels the Talbot-Meriwether County line south of Manchester. At the extreme eastern end of the Pine Mountain Ridge, it is cut by the Flint River, forming the steep bluffs of Sprewell Bluff Park in Upson County.

F.D. Roosevelt State Park, the largest state park in Georgia, is found along the ridge in northern Harris County.
