= Pine Mountain, Georgia =

Town in Harris County, Georgia, US

Pine Mountain, Georgia Chipley
- Town
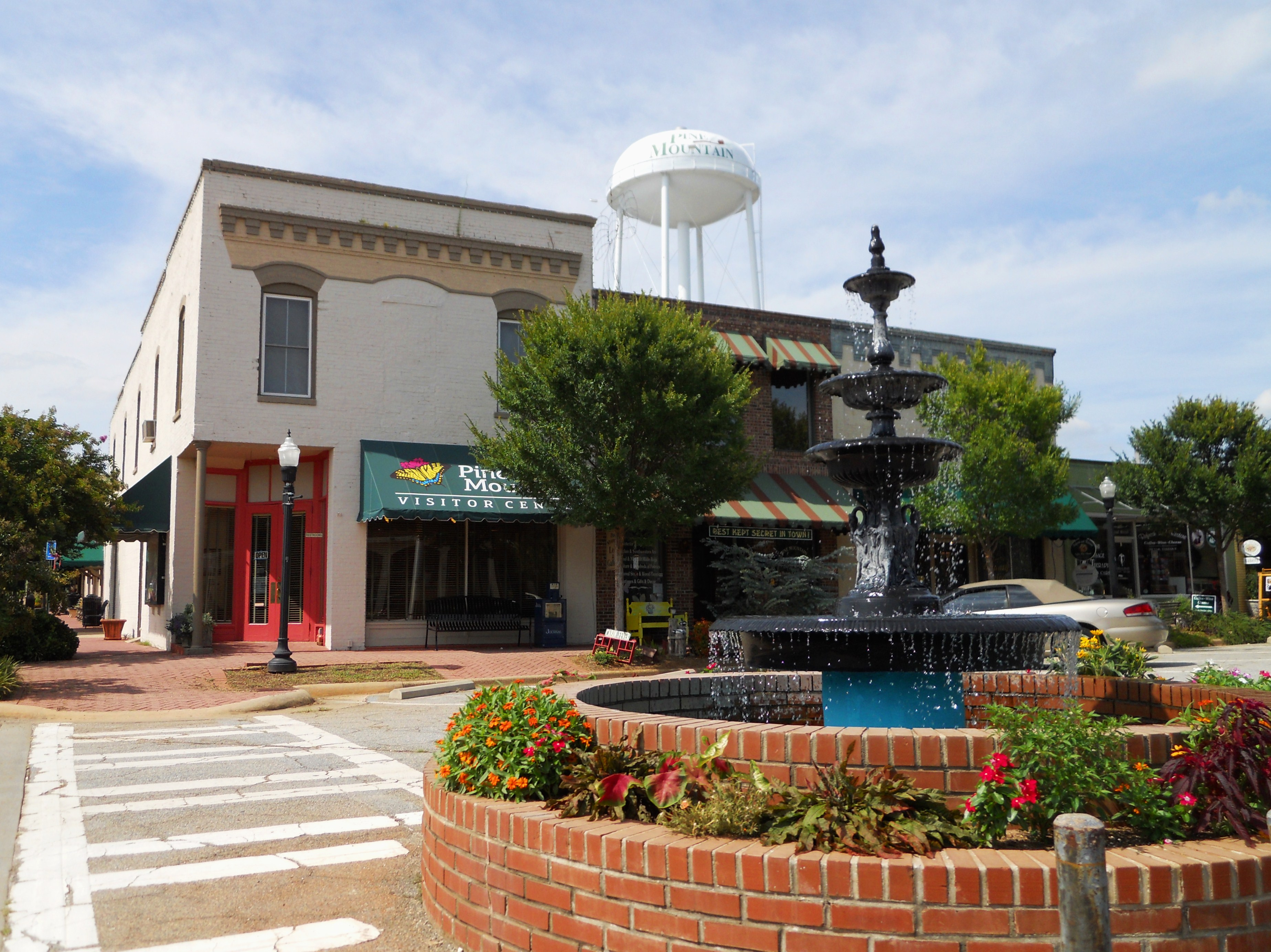
- "Gateway to Callaway Gardens"

- Location in Harris County and the state of Georgia
- Coordinates: 32°51′53″N 84°51′14″W
- Country: United States
- State: Georgia
- Counties: Harris, Meriwether

Area
  - Total: 3.18 sq mi (8.24 km^{2})
  - Land: 3.08 sq mi (7.97 km^{2})
  - Water: 0.10 sq mi (0.27 km^{2})
- Elevation: 922 ft (281 m)

Population (2020)
  - Total: 1,216
  - Density: 395.0/sq mi (152.51/km^{2})
- ZIP Code: 31822
- Area code: 706
- FIPS code: 13-61124
- GNIS feature ID: 356471
- Website: pinemountainga.org

Pine Mountain is a town in Harris and Meriwether counties in the U.S. state of Georgia. As of the 2020 census it had a population of 1,216.

The Harris County portion of Pine Mountain is part of the Columbus, Georgia metropolitan area, while the small portion that extends into Meriwether County is part of the Atlanta metropolitan area.

== History ==
The town began in 1882 when the railroad spread to Pine Mountain from Columbus, and until 1958, the community was known as "Chipley". The name was changed to "Pine Mountain" due to the existence of Callaway Gardens.

== Geography ==
Pine Mountain is located in northeastern Harris County, with a small portion extending north into the southwestern corner of Meriwether County. The town is located along U.S. Route 27, which runs north to south through the town, leading northwest 17 miles (27 km) to LaGrange and south 8 miles (13 km) to Hamilton, the Harris County seat. Georgia State Route 18 and Georgia State Route 354 intersect U.S. Route 27 in the town limits. Route 18 leads west 20 miles (32 km) to West Point and northeast 16 miles (26 km) to Greenville. Atlanta is 78 miles (126 km) by road to the northeast, and Columbus is 33 miles (53 km) to the southwest. The town is located at the northern base of the Pine Mountain Range.

According to the United States Census Bureau, the town has a total area of 3.2 square miles (8.3 km^{2}), of which 0.1 square miles (0.3 km^{2}), or 3.30%, are water.

== Attractions ==
Located in Pine Mountain are the Callaway Gardens, Pine Mountain Wild Animal Safari, and the Man O War Trail. The Pine Mountain Trail, a 23-mile (37 km) hiking trail, is nearby in F. D. Roosevelt State Park.

== Demographics ==
Historical population
Census	Pop.	Note	%±
1900	459		—
1910	742		61.7%
1920	728		−1.9%
1930	583		−19.9%
1940	709		21.6%
1950	817		15.2%
1960	790		−3.3%
1970	862		9.1%
1980	984		14.2%
1990	875		−11.1%
2000	1,141		30.4%
2010	1,304		14.3%
2020	1,216		−6.7%
U.S. Decennial Census

=== 2020 census ===
As of the 2020 census, Pine Mountain had a population of 1,216. The median age was 50.6 years. 18.7% of residents were under the age of 18 and 29.9% of residents were 65 years of age or older. For every 100 females there were 81.0 males, and for every 100 females age 18 and over there were 75.2 males age 18 and over.

0.0% of residents lived in urban areas, while 100.0% lived in rural areas.

There were 573 households in Pine Mountain, of which 25.1% had children under the age of 18 living in them. Of all households, 44.2% were married-couple households, 15.5% were households with a male householder and no spouse or partner present, and 37.9% were households with a female householder and no spouse or partner present. About 33.8% of all households were made up of individuals and 16.4% had someone living alone who was 65 years of age or older.

There were 745 housing units, of which 23.1% were vacant. The homeowner vacancy rate was 2.8% and the rental vacancy rate was 14.3%.

Racial composition as of the 2020 census
Race	Number	Percent
White	730	60.0%
Black or African American	398	32.7%
American Indian and Alaska Native	1	0.1%
Asian	14	1.2%
Native Hawaiian and Other Pacific Islander	1	0.1%
Some other race	30	2.5%
Two or more races	42	3.5%
Hispanic or Latino (of any race)	27	2.2%

=== 2000 census ===
As of the census of 2000, there were 1,141 people, 480 households, and 314 families residing in the town.

== Gallery ==
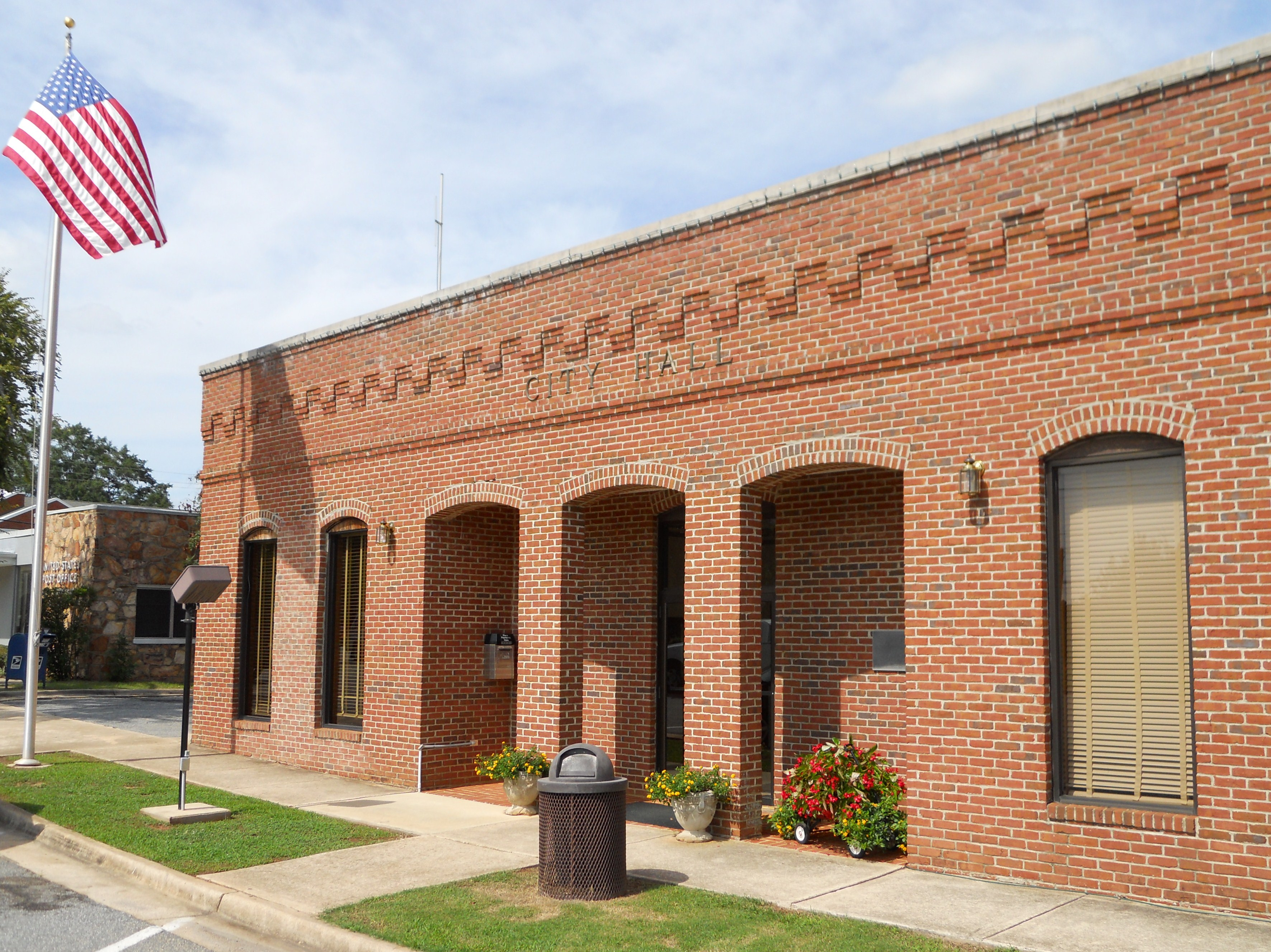
Pine Mountain City Hall

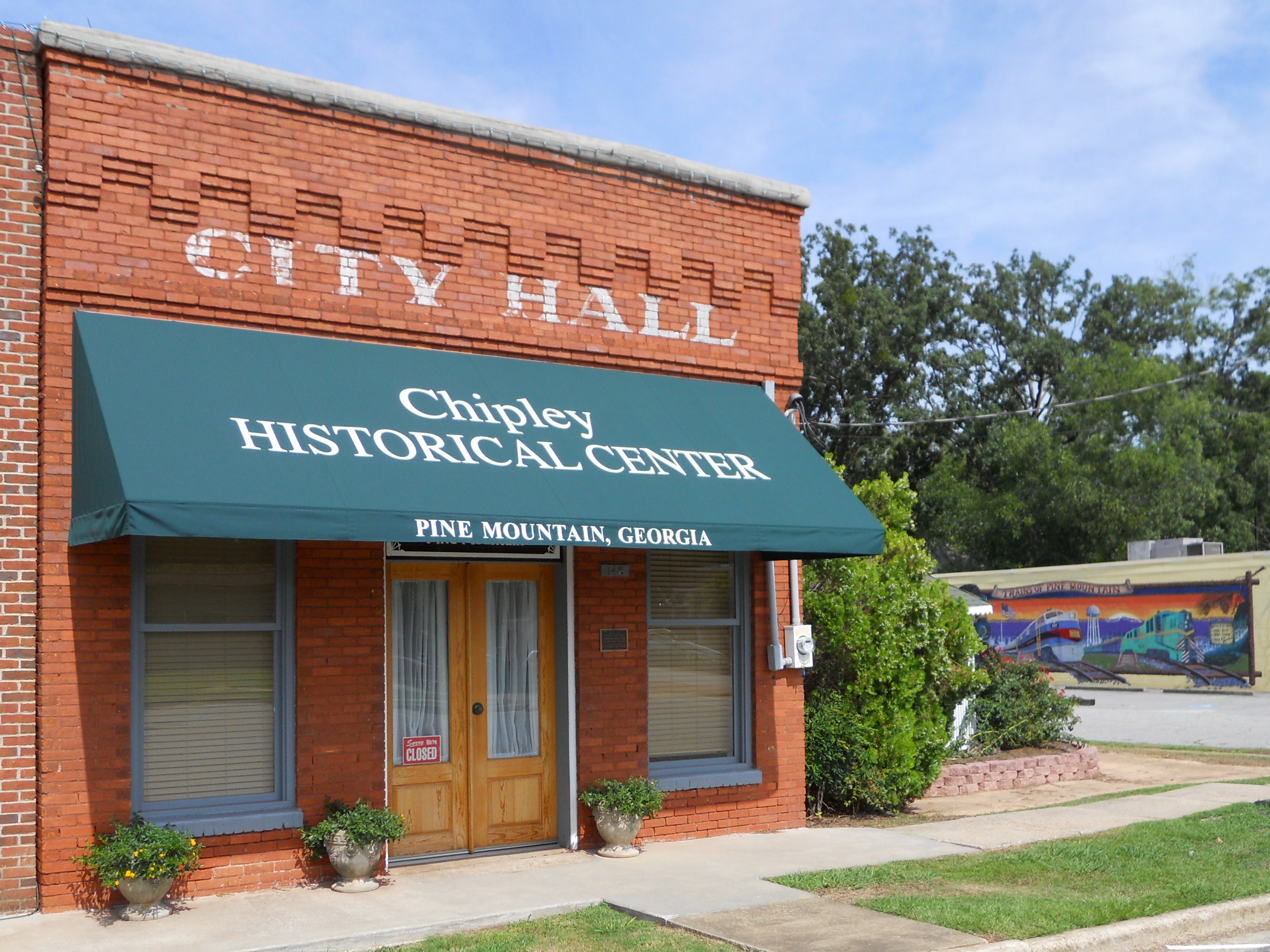
The Chipley-Pine Mountain Town Hall was added to the National Register of Historic Places in 1986.

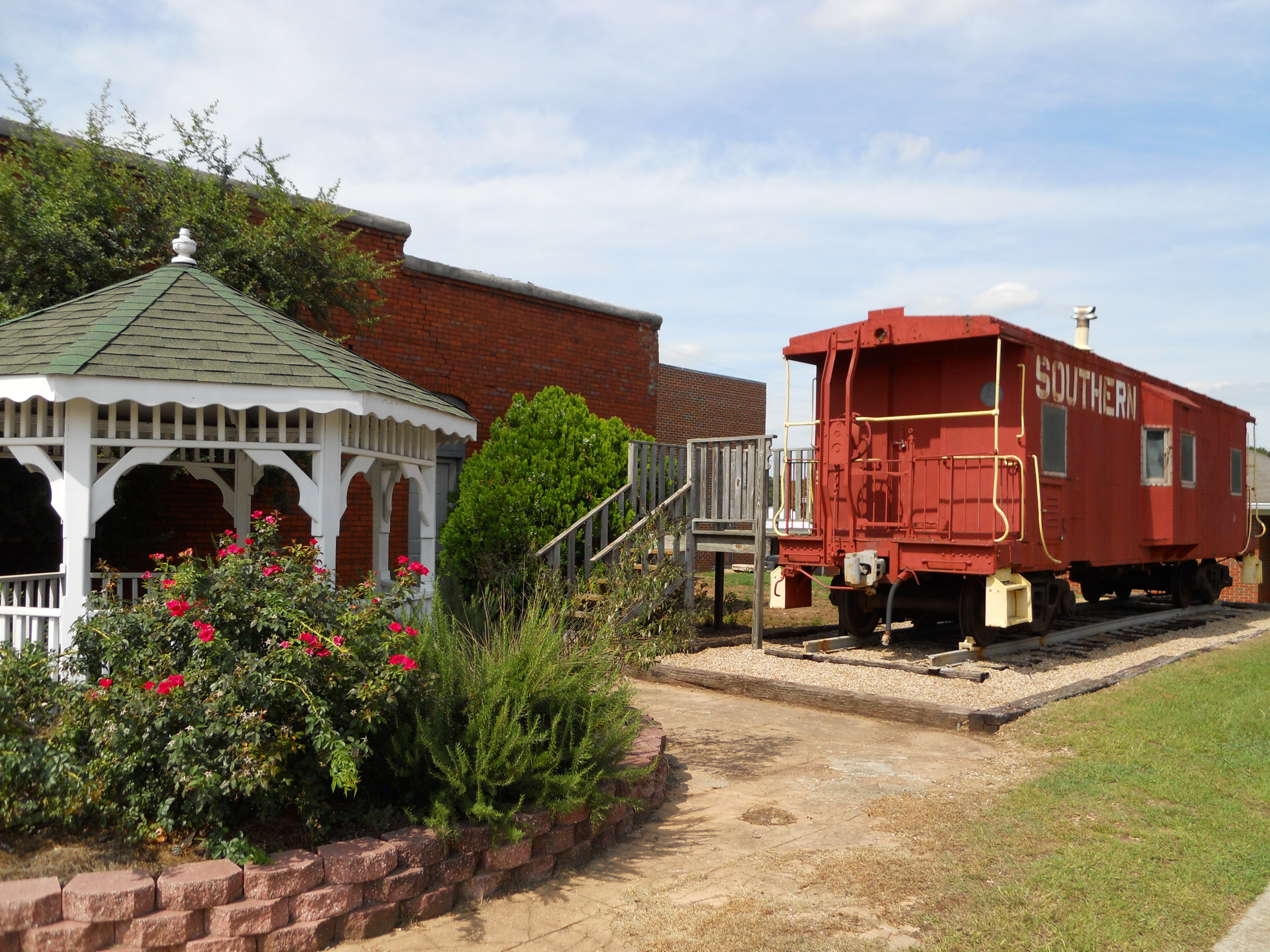
The Chipley Historical Center
