= National Register of Historic Places listings in Clay County, Indiana =

Location of Clay County in Indiana

This is a list of the National Register of Historic Places listings in Clay County, Indiana.

This is intended to be a complete list of the properties and districts on the National Register of Historic Places in Clay County, Indiana, United States. Latitude and longitude coordinates are provided for many National Register properties and districts; these locations may be seen together in a map.

There are 14 properties and districts listed on the National Register in the county. Another two properties were once listed but have been removed.

Properties and districts located in incorporated areas display the name of the municipality, while properties and districts in unincorporated areas display the name of their civil township. Properties and districts split between multiple jurisdictions display the names of all jurisdictions.

This National Park Service list is complete through NPS recent listings posted August 29, 2025.

== Current listings ==
	Name on the Register	Image	Date listed	Location	City or town	Description
1	Aqueduct Bridge	Aqueduct Bridge	March 15, 2000 (#00000209)	Towpath Rd. over Birch Creek, northwest of Clay City; 39°19′36″N 87°10′46″W	Perry and Sugar Ridge Townships	
2	Brazil Downtown Historic District	Brazil Downtown Historic District	June 25, 1997 (#97000601)	E. and W. National Ave. between Depot and Forest Aves. 39°31′23″N 87°07′39″W	Brazil	
3	Clay County Courthouse	Clay County Courthouse	September 9, 1999 (#99001109)	Bounded by U.S. Route 40, Harrison, Jackson, and Alabama Sts. 39°31′28″N 87°07′11″W	Brazil	
4	Clay County Hospital	Clay County Hospital	October 1, 1999 (#99001154)	1200 E. National Ave. 39°31′43″N 87°06′41″W	Brazil	
5	Eaglefield Place	Eaglefield Place	August 28, 1998 (#98001104)	4870 E. U.S. Route 40, east of Brazil; 39°32′50″N 87°00′56″W	Van Buren Township	
6	Feeder Dam Bridge	Feeder Dam Bridge	March 15, 2000 (#00000215)	Towpath Rd. over the Eel River, north of Clay City; 39°20′09″N 87°06′49″W	Harrison and Sugar Ridge Townships	
7	Indiana State Highway Bridge 42-11-3101	Indiana State Highway Bridge 42-11-3101	March 15, 2000 (#00000210)	State Road 42 over the Eel River, west of Poland; 39°26′40″N 86°59′37″W	Cass Township	
8	Jeffers Bridge	Jeffers Bridge	March 15, 2000 (#00000213)	County Road 200S over Birch Creek, north of Clay City; 39°21′31″N 87°08′32″W	Perry and Sugar Ridge Townships	
9	Kennedy-Hoffa House		August 21, 2024 (#100010746)	501 East Main Street; 39°25′01″N 87°04′33″W	Center Point	
10	Meridian-Forest Historic District	Meridian-Forest Historic District	June 26, 1997 (#97000600)	Roughly bounded by N. Meridian, E. Chestnut, N. Forest, E. and W. Church, and State Sts. 39°31′41″N 87°07′41″W	Brazil	
11	Poland Presbyterian Church and Cemetery	Poland Presbyterian Church and Cemetery	December 18, 1990 (#90001932)	State Road 42 near County Road 56S at Poland; 39°26′41″N 86°57′14″W	Cass Township	
12	Shakamak State Park Historic District	Shakamak State Park Historic District	March 15, 2000 (#00000199)	6265 W. State Road 48, northwest of Jasonville; 39°10′35″N 87°14′04″W	Lewis Township	Extends into Greene and Sullivan counties
13	Tide Water Pumping Station	Tide Water Pumping Station	September 3, 1999 (#99001076)	Southwestern corner of the junction of 900S and 300E, north of Coal City; 39°15′16″N 87°03′21″W	Harrison Township	
14	US Post Office-Brazil	US Post Office-Brazil	September 8, 1994 (#94001132)	100 E. National Ave. 39°31′26″N 87°07′33″W	Brazil	

== Former listing ==
	Name on the Register	Image	Date listed	Date removed	Location	City or town	Description
1	Coal Company Store		May 22, 1986 (#86001121)	February 7, 1992	S. Harmony Rd. 39°32′04″N 87°04′24″W	Harmony	
2	Indiana State Highway Bridge 46-11-1316	Indiana State Highway Bridge 46-11-1316	March 15, 2000 (#00000211)	December 9, 2020	State Road 46 over the Eel River at Bowling Green; 39°23′03″N 87°01′14″W	Washington Township	

== See also ==
- List of National Historic Landmarks in Indiana
- National Register of Historic Places listings in Indiana
- Listings in neighboring counties: Greene, Owen, Parke, Putnam, Sullivan, Vigo
- List of Indiana state historical markers in Clay County
