= List of Indiana state historical markers in Clay County =

Location of Clay County in Indiana

This is a list of the Indiana state historical markers in Clay County.

This is intended to be a complete list of the official state historical markers placed in Clay County, Indiana, United States by the Indiana Historical Bureau. The locations of the historical markers and their latitude and longitude coordinates are included below when available, along with their names, years of placement, and topics as recorded by the Historical Bureau. There are 4 historical markers located in Clay County.

== Historical markers ==
Marker title	Image	Year placed	Location	Topics
Crosscut Canal/Eel River Feeder Dam		1999	4 miles north of Clay City at the northwestern corner of the State Road 59 bridge over the Eel River; 39°20′22″N 87°6′36″W	Transportation, Business, Industry, and Labor
Crosscut Canal		1999	6.5 miles south of Clay City on State Road 59 at County Road 1300S, at the northwestern corner of the old K and E Canal bridge 39°11′42″N 87°7′43″W	Business, Industry, and Labor, Transportation
Clay County Courthouse		2001	609 E. National Road/U.S. Route 40 in Brazil; 39°31′28″N 87°7′10″W	Government Institutions, Buildings and Architecture
James R. "Jimmy" Hoffa		2023	National Avenue (US 40) and IN-59, Brazil; 39°31′26″N 87°7′29″W	Business, Industry, & Labor

== See also ==
- List of Indiana state historical markers
- National Register of Historic Places listings in Clay County, Indiana
