= Vincennes Bridge Company =

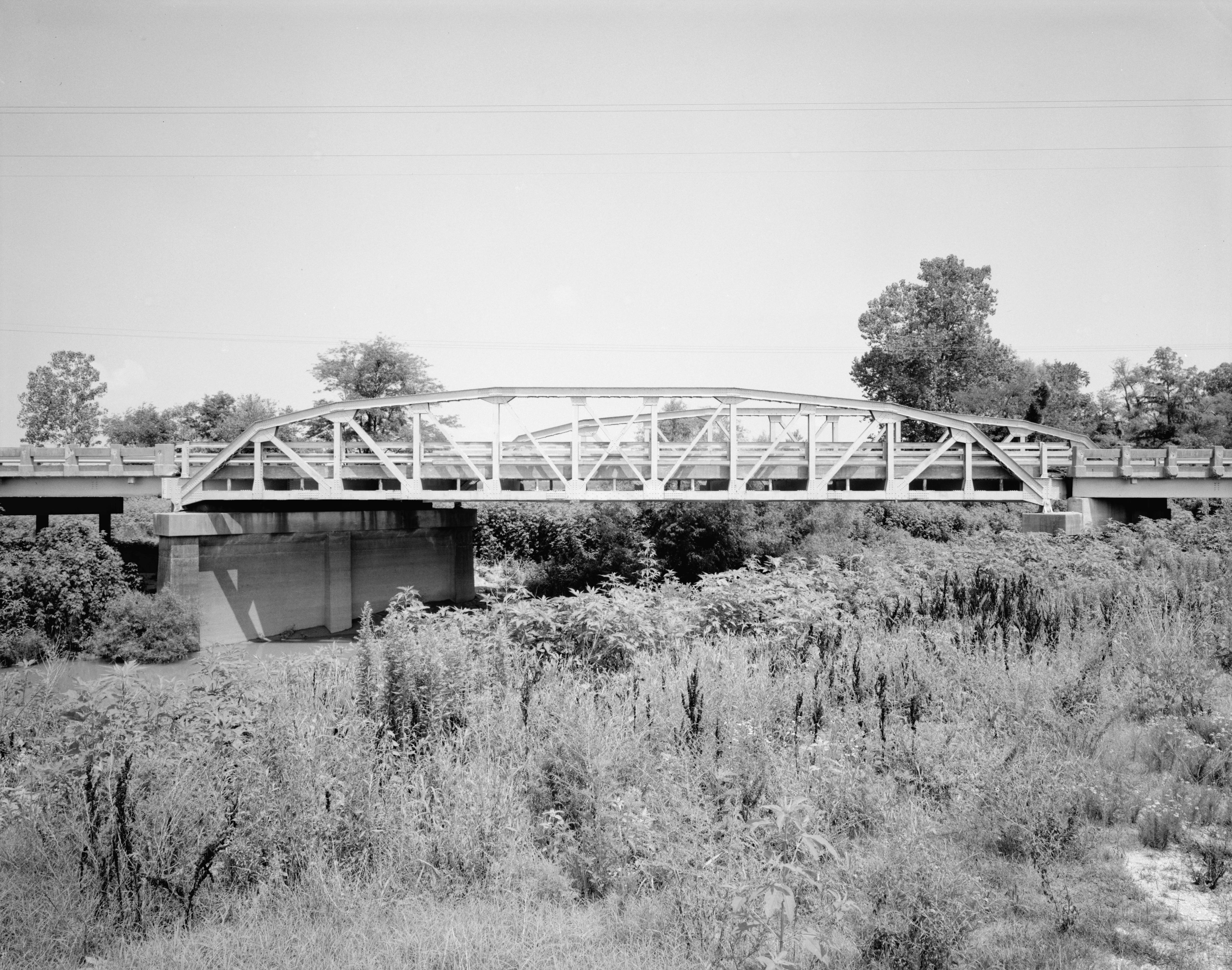
Cache River Bridge, 1988

The Vincennes Bridge Company, based in Vincennes, Indiana, was a designer and builder of bridges that was "one of Indiana's 'most successful bridge-building firms'".

== History ==
It was founded by three schoolteachers in 1898. The firm produced more than 1200 bridges per year by 1920. The firm reincorporated as Vincennes Steel Company in 1932. The Vincennes Steel Company ceased to exist by 2006, when its assets were folded into Wabash Steel, Inc.

A number of its works are listed on the U.S. National Register of Historic Places.

== Works (attribution) ==
- Aqueduct Bridge, Towpath Road over Birch Creek, Clay City, Indiana (Vincennes Bridge Company), NRHP-listed
- Cache River Bridge, a Parker pony truss that spans the Cache River between Walnut Ridge and Paragould, Arkansas. It was built in 1934. AR 25, over the Cache River, Walnut Ridge, Arkansas (Vincennes Bridge Co.), NRHP-listed
- College Street Bridge, spans Barren River, Bowling Green, Kentucky (Vincennes Bridge Co.), NRHP-listed
- Cordell Hull Bridge, Bridge Street over the Cumberland River, Carthage, Tennessee (Vincennes Steel Corporation), NRHP-listed
- Hutsonville Bridge, IN 154 over the Wabash River, Hutsonville, Illinois, and Graysville, Indiana (Vincennes Steel Corporation)
- Indiana State Highway Bridge 42-11-3101, IN 42 over Eel River, Poland, Indiana (Vincennes Bridge Company), NRHP-listed
- Indiana State Highway Bridge 46-11-1316, IN 46 over Eel River, Bowling Green, Indiana (Vincennes Bridge Company), NRHP-listed
- Jeffers Bridge, CR 200 S over Birch Creek, Clay City, Indiana (Vincennes Bridge Company), NRHP-listed
- Montopolis Bridge, US 183, 8.1 miles (13.0 km) south of junction with I-35, Austin, Texas (Vincennes Steel Corporation), NRHP-listed
- North Fork Bridge, AR 5 over North Fork River, Norfork, Arkansas (Vincennes Bridge Co.), NRHP-listed
- Petit Jean River Bridge, County Road 49 over the Petit Jean River, Ola, Arkansas (Vincennes Bridge company), NRHP-listed
- Secrest Ferry Bridge, County Road 450 E over the West Fork of the White River, Gosport, Indiana (Vincennes Bridge Co.), NRHP-listed
- St. Francis River Bridge, AR 18, over the St. Francis River, Lake City, Arkansas (Vincennes Bridge Co.), NRHP-listed
- US 67 Bridge over Little Missouri River, US 67, Prescott, Arkansas (Vincennes Bridge Co.), NRHP-listed
- Interstate 95 Gold Star Memorial Bridge crossing the Thames River - New London, Connecticut
