= Middlebury, Clay County, Indiana =

Middlebury
- Unincorporated community
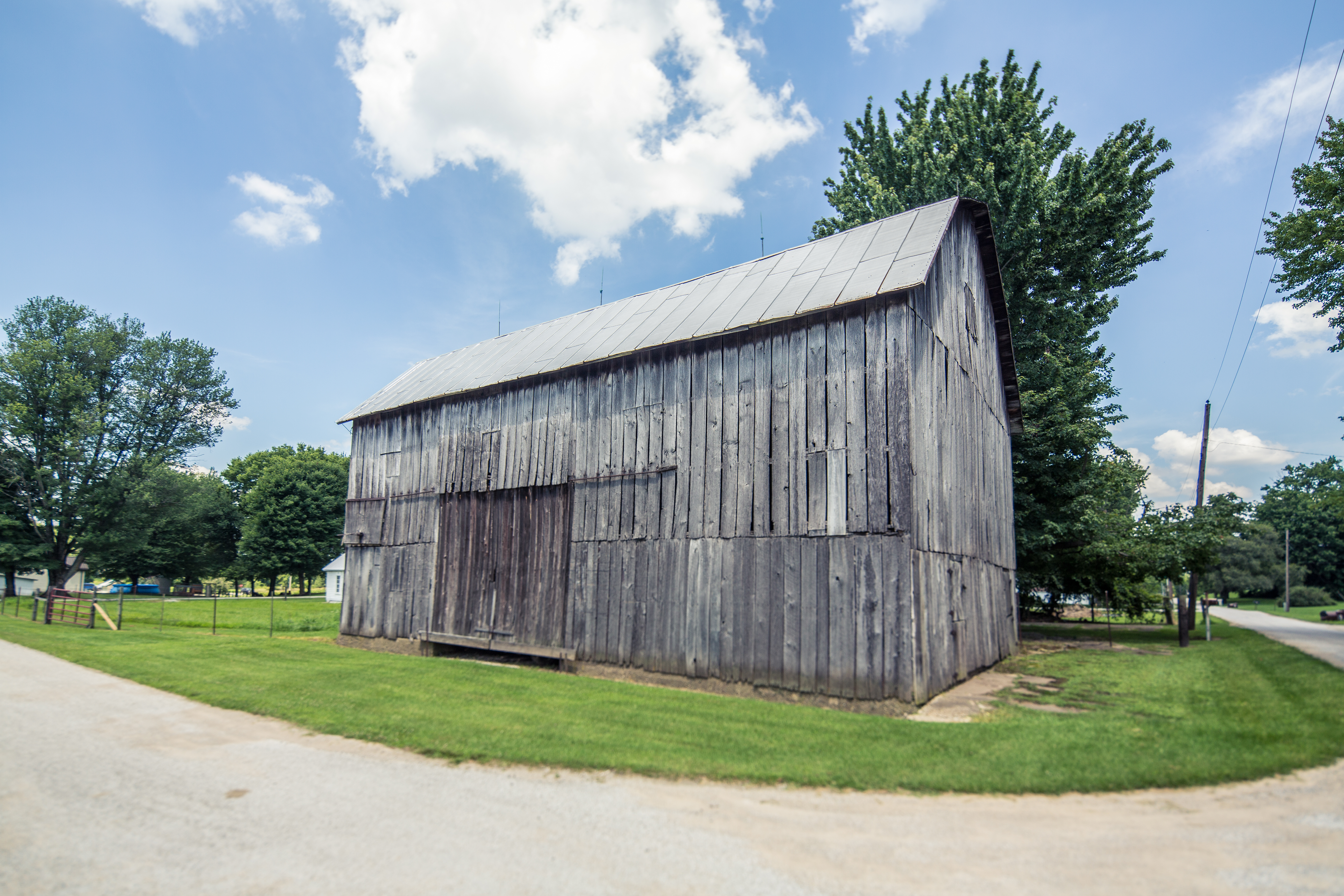
- A barn in Middlebury in 2016.

- Location in Clay County
- Coordinates: 39°15′51″N 87°07′08″W
- Country: United States
- State: Indiana
- County: Clay
- Township: Harrison
- Elevation: 669 ft (204 m)
- GNIS feature ID: 439112

Middlebury is an unincorporated community in Harrison Township, Clay County, Indiana. It is part of the Terre Haute Metropolitan Statistical Area.

== History ==
Middlebury was laid out in 1836.

The only post office the community of Middlebury contained was called Martz. It operated from 1854 until 1907.

== Geography ==
Middlebury is located at 39°15′51″N 87°07′08″W.

== Demographics ==
The United States Census Bureau defined Middlebury as a census designated place in the 2022 American Community Survey.
