= Ralph Francis Stearley =

United States Air Force general

- General Ralph F. Stearley
- Born: July 25, 1898; Brazil, Indiana, U.S.
- Died: February 3, 1973 (aged 74); Brazil, Indiana, U.S.
- Burial place: Arlington National Cemetery
- Military career
- Allegiance: United States of America
- Branch: United States Air Force; United States Army
- Service years: 1918–1954
- Rank: Major general
- Commands: I Tactical Air Division; IX Tactical Air Command; Fourteenth Air Force; Twentieth Air Force
- Conflicts: World War I World War II; Korean War
- Awards: Distinguished Service Medal; Legion of Merit; Air Medal; Bronze Star Medal; Commendation Medal

Ralph Francis Stearley, CBE, (July 25, 1898 – February 3, 1973) was a United States Army and Air Force officer. He is best known as a general in the United States Army Air Forces during World War II. Stearly was born in Brazil, Indiana, in 1898. He graduated from the United States Military Academy at West Point, New York, and was commissioned a second lieutenant in the cavalry on November 1, 1918. He transferred to the Air Service in 1925 and commanded the IX Tactical Air Command during the last two months of the war in Europe, supporting the United States First Army during combat operations in Europe.

== Education ==
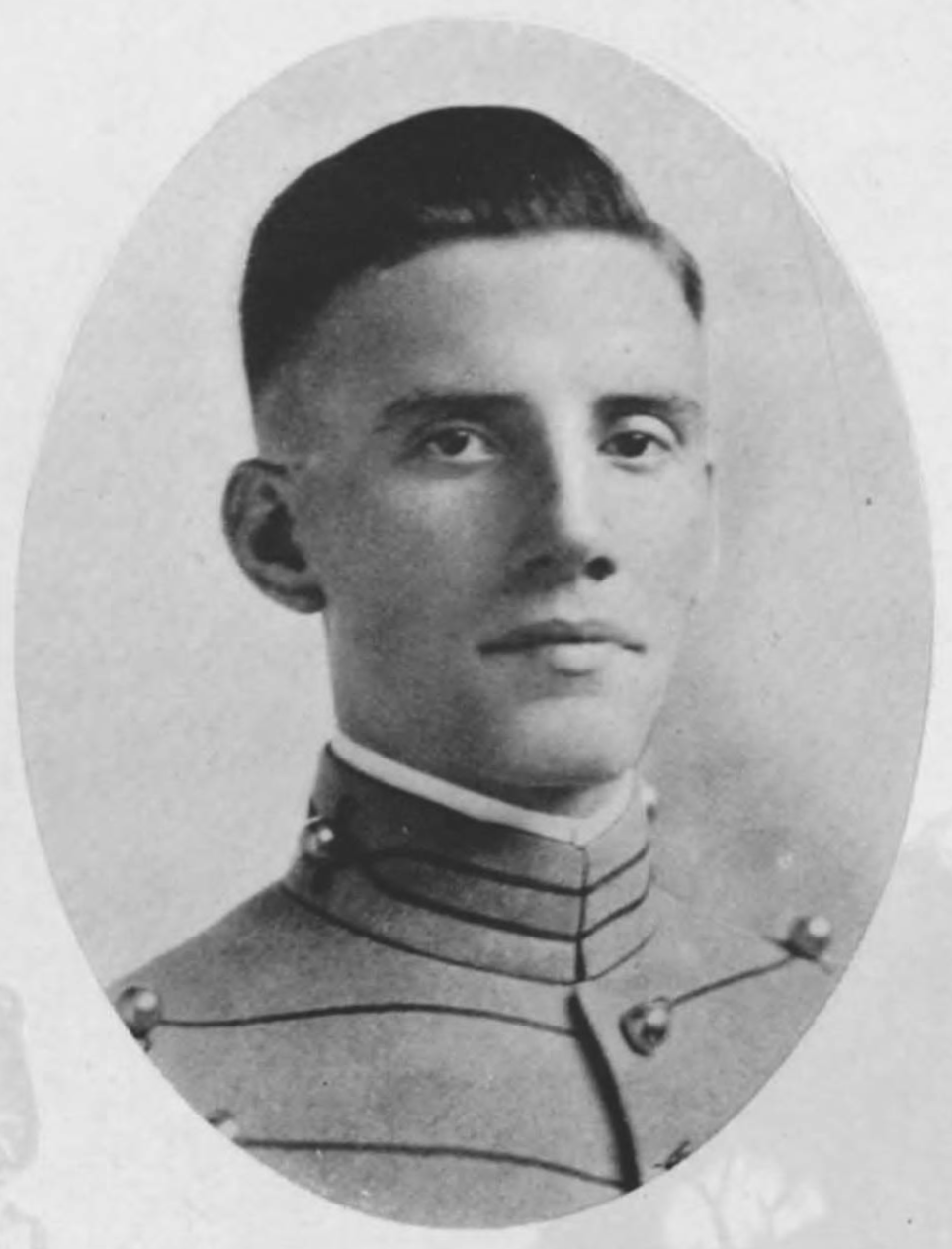
As a West Point cadet

After graduation, he remained at the academy until the following July, when he made a tour of battlefields in Europe. Upon his return to the United States in October 1919, he entered the Cavalry School at Fort Riley, Kansas, from which he graduated the following July. He then joined the 4th Cavalry at Fort Brown, Texas.

He entered Yale University in New Haven, Connecticut, in August 1921 and after completing the communications engineering course in June 1922 was assigned to the 4th Cavalry at Fort McIntosh, Texas. In March 1923 he joined the 1st Signal Troop of the 1st Cavalry at Fort Bliss, Texas.

== Early career ==
In March 1925 he was transferred to the Air Service and went to Brooks Field, Texas, for training at the Primary Flying School. In September of that year he was transferred to Kelly Field, Texas, where he attended the Advanced Flying School. Upon graduation in March 1926, earning his rating of Airplane Pilot, he remained at Kelly Field for duty with the 3rd Attack Group.

He was ordered to the Philippines in July 1928 for duty with the 4th Composite Group at Nichols Field. Upon returning to the United States in July 1930, he was again assigned to the 3rd Attack Group, now at Fort Crockett, Texas, where he commanded the 13th Attack Squadron. In February 1934 he went to Chicago, Illinois, for duty with the Army Air Corps Mail Operations, and in August of that year he entered the Air Corps Tactical School at Maxwell Field, Alabama. In September 1935 he entered the Command and General Staff School at Fort Leavenworth, Kansas. He graduated the following June, at which time he returned to Maxwell Field for a two-year tour as an instructor at the Air Corps Tactical School. In July and August 1938 he attended the Chemical Warfare School at Edgewood Arsenal, Maryland, after which he returned to Maxwell Field.

In May 1940 he became assistant executive officer in the Training and Operations Division of the Office of the Chief of Air Corps in Washington, which later became the Flying Training Command.

== World War II ==
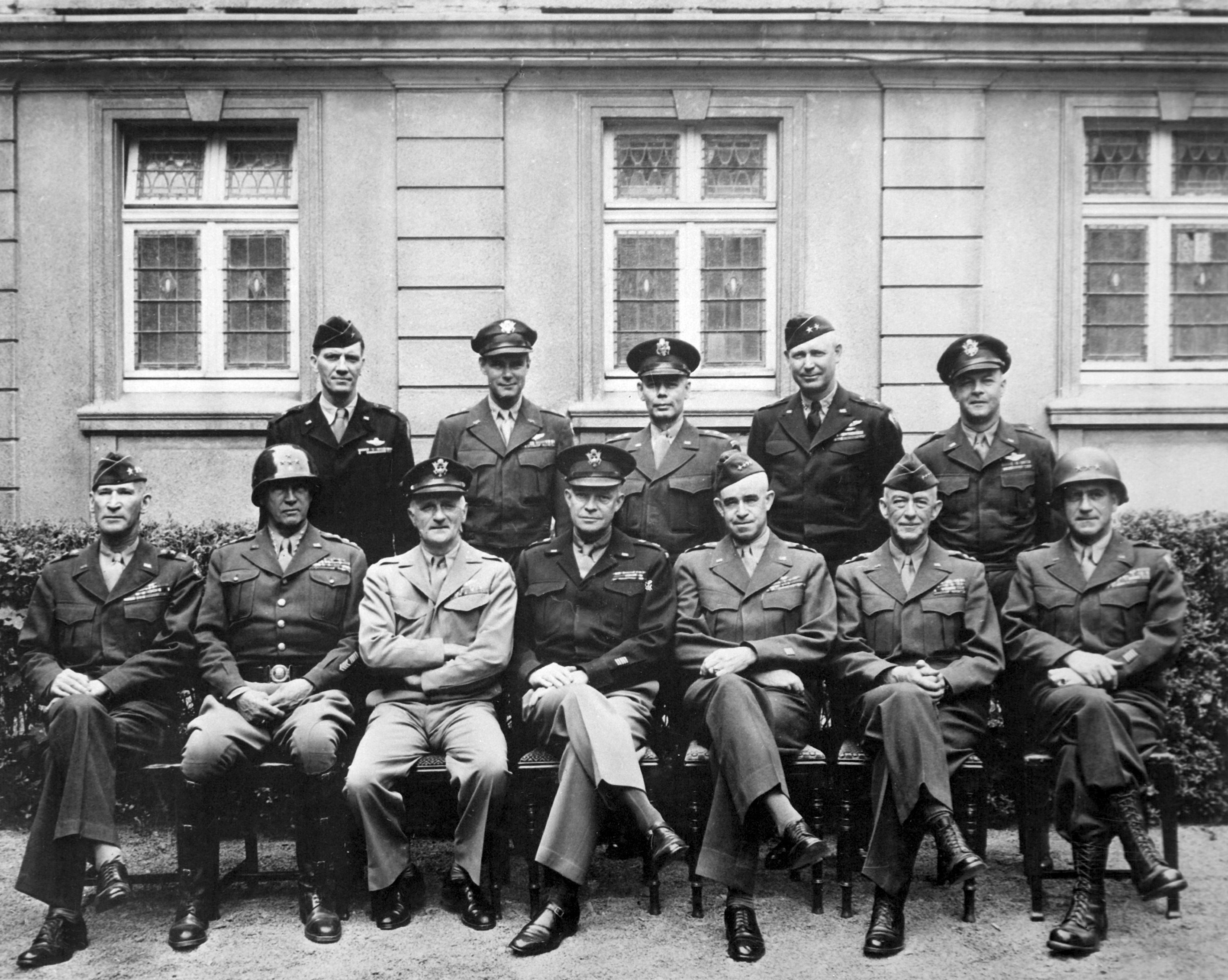
Stearley (standing, far left) with SHAEF and 12th Army Group commanders in April 1945

During April 1942 he served on the Canadian–American Military Board and in June of that year was appointed chief of the Air Group of the Military Intelligence Service of the War Department General Staff in Washington, D.C. He became director of Air Support at Army Air Forces headquarters in January 1943 and the following May assumed command of the I Air Support Command at Morris Field, North Carolina, which was soon redesignated the I Tactical Air Division.

In April 1944 he joined the Ninth Air Force in the European theater as A-3 (chief of operations). The following August he became assistant chief of staff for G-3 of the newly organized First Allied Airborne Army, and in April 1945 was appointed commanding general of the IX Tactical Air Command of the Ninth Air Force, which operated in France and Northern Germany. The following September he became commander of the Air Section, Fifteenth Army Theater General Board, in the European theater.

== Post-war ==
He returned to Air Force headquarters in January 1946 for duty as deputy chief of the Legislative and Liaison Division of the War Department General Staff. Two years later, he was appointed director of the Legislative and Liaison Division of the Directorate of Public Relations in the Office of the Secretary of the Air Force.

He was named commanding general of the Fourteenth Air Force at Orlando Air Force Base, Florida, in July 1948 and retained that position when the 14th Air Force was moved to Robins Air Force Base, Georgia, in October 1949.

In July 1950 he was appointed commanding general of the Twentieth Air Force at Kadena Air Base, Okinawa.

He died in Brazil, Indiana, on February 3, 1973, and was buried at Arlington National Cemetery.

== Awards and commendations ==
Distinguished Service Medal
Legion of Merit
Bronze Star Medal
Air Medal
Commendation Medal
Order of the British Empire, Degree of Commander (CBE) Honorary
Chevalier de la Légion d'honneur (France)
Croix de Guerre avec Palme (France)
Order of Leopold (Belgium)
Croix de Guerre avec Palme (Belgium)
Orde van Oranje-Nassau, Degree of Commander (The Netherlands)

He was rated a command pilot, combat observer and aircraft observer.

== Sources ==
- Air Force Historical Study No. 91 Fogerty, Robert P.(1953). Biographical Data on Air Force General Officers, 1917-1952 Volume 2 - L thru Z: Stearley, Ralph F.
