= Cordell Hull Bridge =

- U.S. National Register of Historic Places
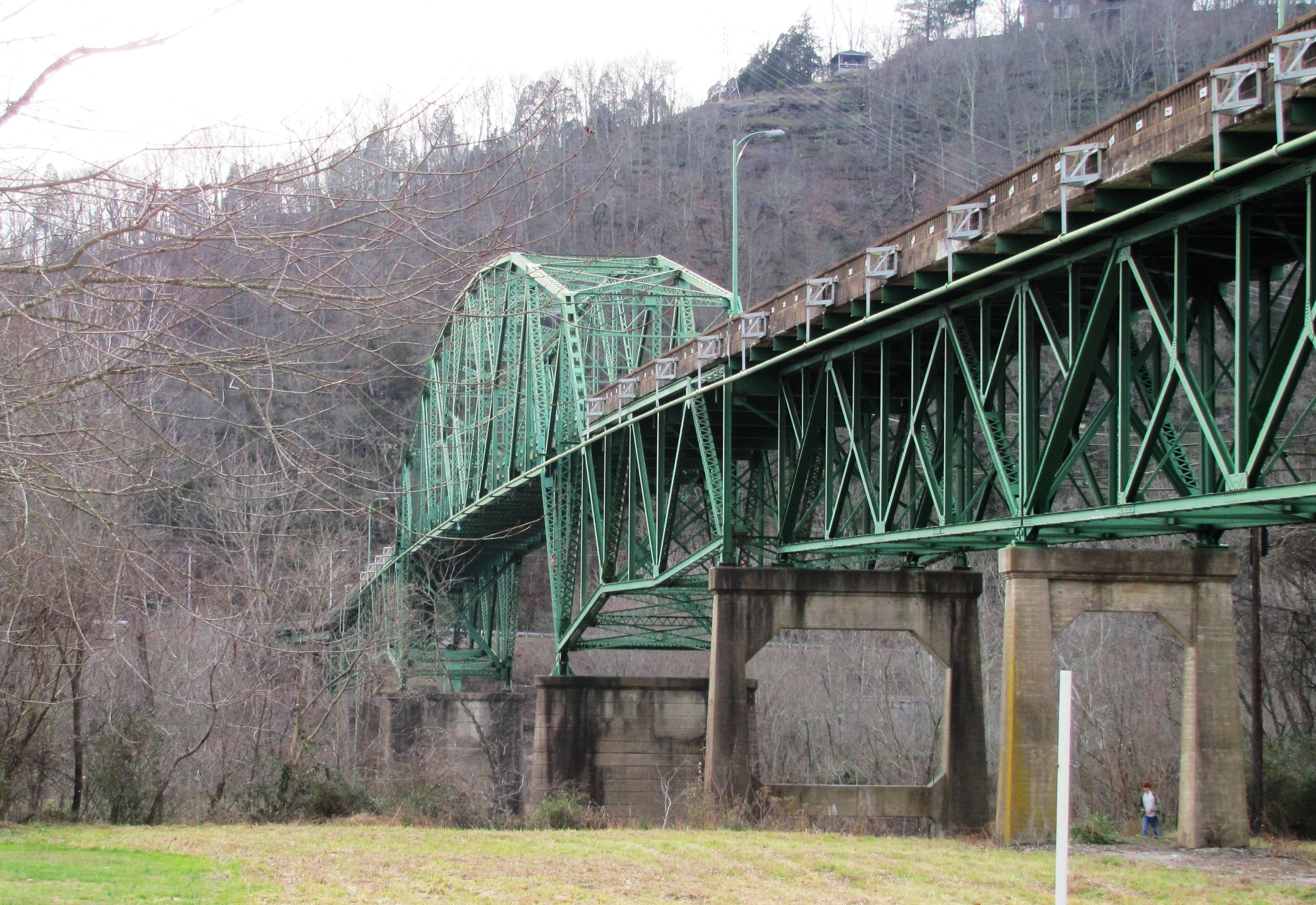
- The Cordell Hull Bridge in 2010

- Location within Tennessee Location within the United States
- Location: Cordell Hull Street, Carthage, Tennessee, U.S.
- Coordinates: 36.248519°N 85.954753°W
- Area: less than 1 acre (0.40 ha)
- Built: 1934
- Built by: Vincennes Steel Corporation
- Architect: Tennessee Department of Highways and Public Works
- Architectural style: continuous 3 span Parker Truss
- NRHP reference No.: 09000951
- Added to NRHP: November 20, 2009

The Cordell Hull Bridge is a bridge over the Cumberland River in the U.S. state of Tennessee that connects the towns of Carthage and South Carthage.

== History ==
The bridge was built by the Vincennes Bridge Company. Surveys began in 1933, construction started in December 1934, and the bridge was opened to traffic on May 14, 1936. It was named after Cordell Hull, who served as the 47th United States Secretary of State from 1933 to 1944. The bridge carried Tennessee State Route 25 to its southern terminus at US 70N in South Carthage until 1990, when the route was realigned to a bypass around the northern and eastern edge of town. It was restored in the 2010s, and rededicated on July 2, 2012.

It has been listed on the National Register of Historic Places since November 20, 2009.

It was closed indefinitely on June 8, 2022, after a routine inspection revealed a 24 inch long crack in the truss. The bridge was reopened to traffic on June 22, 2022, following an inspection by the Tennessee Department of Transportation.
