= Eel River, Clay County, Indiana =

Eel River
- Unincorporated community
- Location in Clay County
- Coordinates: 39°19′24″N 87°07′25″W
- Country: United States
- State: Indiana
- County: Clay
- Township: Harrison
- Elevation: 551 ft (168 m)
- GNIS feature ID: 434035

Eel River is an unincorporated community in northern Harrison Township, Clay County, Indiana. It is part of the Terre Haute Metropolitan Statistical Area.

== History ==
The Eel River, from which this community takes its name, was so named from a Native American word meaning "slippery fish".

== Geography ==
Ell River is located at 39°19′24″N 87°07′25″W.
