= Gerald Eades Bentley =

American literary critic (1901–1994)

Gerald Eades Bentley (September 15, 1901 – July 25, 1994) was an American academic and literary scholar, best remembered for his seven-volume work, The Jacobean and Caroline Stage, published by Oxford University Press between 1941 and 1968. That work, modeled on Edmund Kerchever Chambers' classic four-volume The Elizabethan Stage, has itself become a standard and essential reference work on English Renaissance theatre.

Bentley was born in Brazil, Indiana, the son of a Methodist clergyman. Originally intending to be a creative writer, he changed his career to literary scholarship during his graduate studies. He earned his B.A. at DePauw University (1923), his M.A. in English at the University of Illinois at Urbana–Champaign (1926), and his Ph.D. at the University of London (1929), studying under Allardyce Nicoll. Bentley taught at the University of Chicago from 1929 to 1945 before accepting a position as Murray Professor of English at Princeton University in 1945, where he served until his retirement in 1970. He was elected a member of the American Philosophical Society in 1970 and a Fellow of the American Academy of Arts and Sciences in 1975.

In addition to his Jacobean and Caroline Stage, Bentley wrote a wide range of works on Shakespeare and other figures of the English Renaissance. His essay "Shakespeare and the Blackfriars Theatre," originally published in the inaugural issue of the Shakespeare Survey in 1948, has been widely reprinted. Bentley edited several works for modern editions, including Othello, and The Alchemist.

In his obituary, the New York Times noted that he raised a literary stir in 1956 when he edited and wrote the preface to a hitherto unknown 1577 text called The Arte of Angling in which he noted several passages that reminded him of Isaac Walton's later The Compleat Angler. The Times quotes D. E. Rhodes, a British authority on fishing literature, who defended Walton, saying, "It seems to me unjust to accuse Izaak Walton of plagiarism, because plagiarism did not exist in the 17th century. All authors of that and earlier ages read what they liked and used what they liked of it without acknowledgment."

Bentley was married first to Esther Felt, a significant colleague in his scholarly work, from 1927 until her death in 1961. In 1965, he married Ellen Voigt Stern, who died in 1990. Bentley's son and namesake from his first marriage, Gerald Eades Bentley Jr., became a noted literary scholar in his own right, specializing in the career and works of William Blake. He spent most of his career at the University of Toronto.

== G. E. Bentley: selected works ==
- Shakespeare and Jonson: Their Reputations in the Seventeenth Century Compared (1945)
- Shakespeare: A Biographical Handbook (1961)
- Shakespeare and His Theatre (1964)
- The Profession of Dramatist in Shakespeare's Time, 1590–1642 (1971)
- The Profession of Player in Shakespeare's Time, 1590–1642 (1984)
