= St. Francis River Bridge (Lake City, Arkansas) =

- U.S. National Register of Historic Places
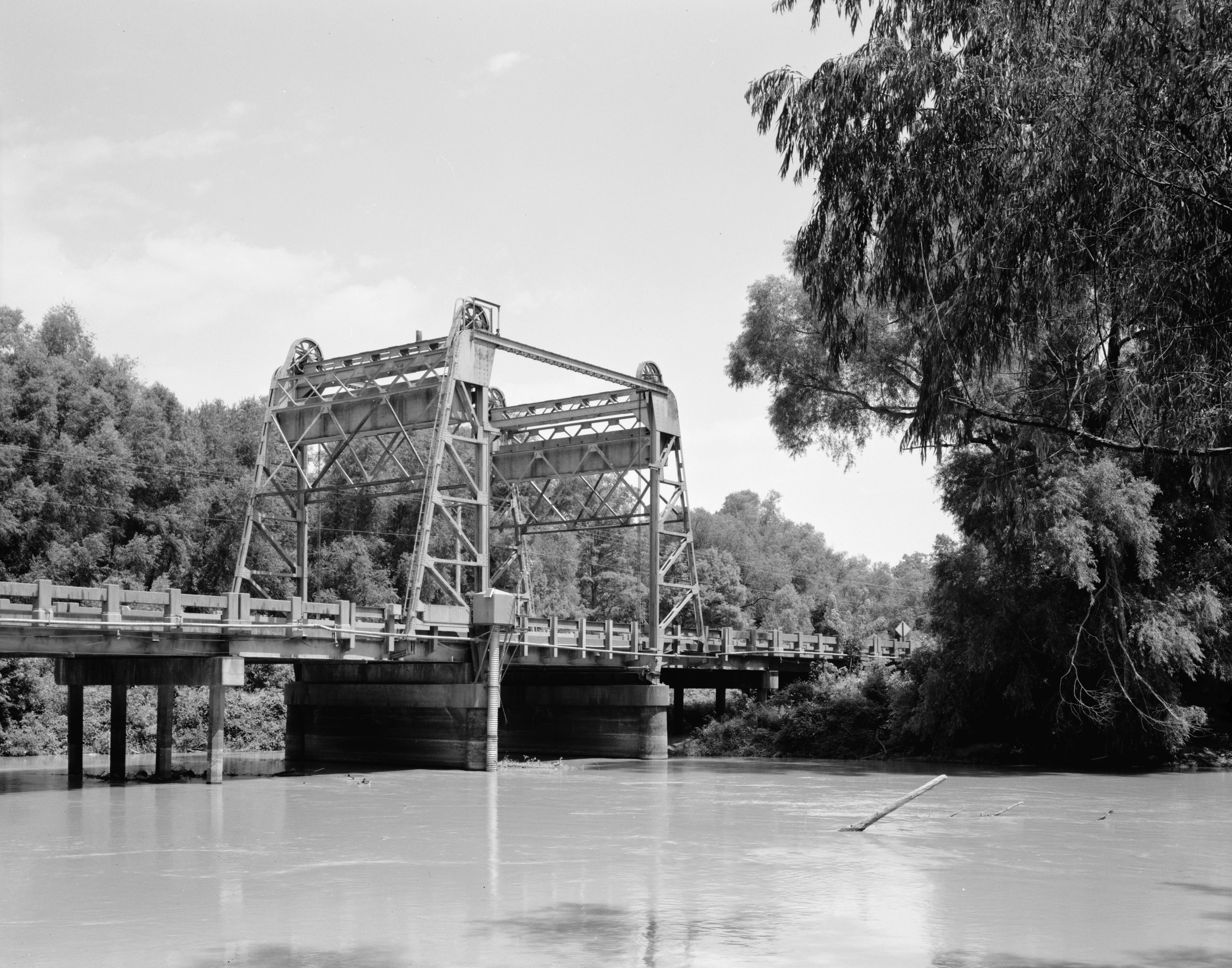
- HAER photo, 1988

- Location within Arkansas Location within the United States
- Location: AR 18 over the St. Francis River, Lake City, Arkansas
- Coordinates: 35°49′16″N 90°25′55″W
- Area: less than one acre
- Built: 1934
- Built by: Arkansas Department of Transportation; Vincennes Bridge Co.
- Architectural style: I-beam vertical lift
- MPS: Historic Bridges of Arkansas MPS
- NRHP reference No.: 90000515
- Added to NRHP: April 9, 1990

The St. Francis River Bridge, also known as the Lake City Bridge, was a historic bridge spanning the St. Francis River at Lake City, Arkansas. It was composed of 109 I-beam trestles and a single vertical lift span, and had a total length of 3,412 feet (1,040 m). The bridge was designed and built in 1934 by the Vincennes Bridge Company, and carried Arkansas Highway 18 until 1998, when a modern 4-span I-beam bridge was built adjacent to it. The old bridge was dismantled, leaving only the vertical lift segment on the east bank of the river.

The bridge was listed on the National Register of Historic Places in 1990.

== See also ==
- List of bridges documented by the Historic American Engineering Record in Arkansas
- List of bridges on the National Register of Historic Places in Arkansas
- National Register of Historic Places listings in Craighead County, Arkansas
