= Cache River Bridge =

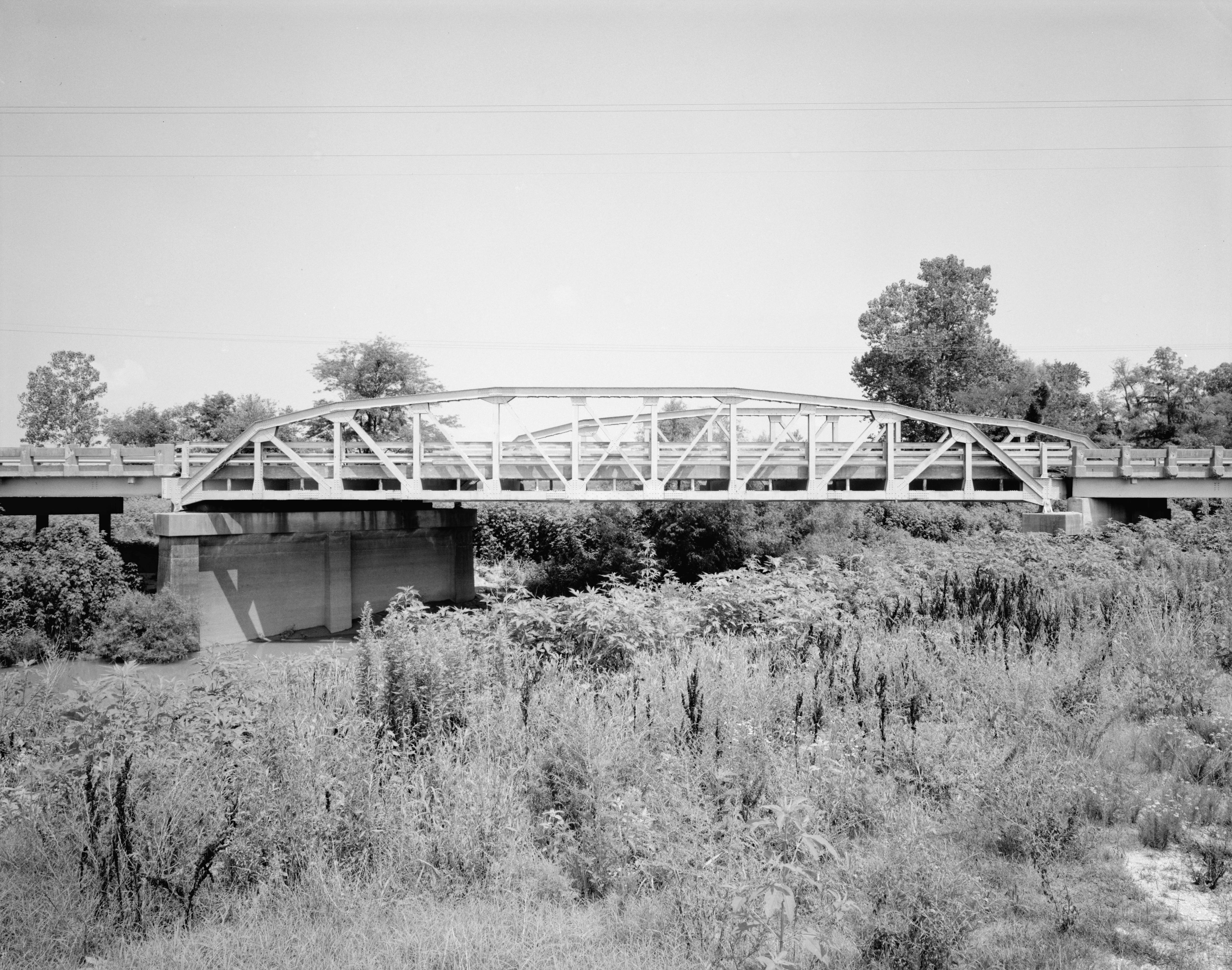
- Coordinates: 36°04′08″N 90°49′26″W
- Crosses: Cache River

Characteristics
- Design: Parker pony truss
- Material: Steel
- Total length: 375 feet 11.5 inches (114.592 m)
- Width: 24 feet (7.3 m)
- Longest span: 100 feet (30 m)

History
- Designer: Vincennes Bridge Company
- Construction end: 1934
- Closed: 1994
- Cache River Bridge
- U.S. National Register of Historic Places
- Location within Arkansas Location within the United States
- Nearest city: Walnut Ridge, Arkansas
- Coordinates: 36°4′9″N 90°49′26″W
- Area: less than one acre
- Built: 1934
- Architect: AHTD; Vincennes Bridge Co.
- Architectural style: Parker pony truss
- MPS: Historic Bridges of Arkansas MPS
- NRHP reference No.: 90000523
- Added to NRHP: April 9, 1990

Location
- Interactive map of Cache River Bridge

The Cache River Bridge is a Parker pony truss that spans the Cache River between Walnut Ridge and Paragould, Arkansas. It was built in 1934 by the Arkansas State Highway Commission and was designed by the Vincennes Bridge Company. Formerly carrying U.S. Route 412 and earlier Arkansas Highway 25, the structure was added to the National Register of Historic Places in 1990, and was bypassed by a new bridge in 1995.

== Routes ==
At construction the bridge carried Arkansas Highway 25 over the Cache River in 1934. Highway 25 was replaced by U.S. Route 412 in the area in 1982. The Cache River Bridge was replaced in 1995 with the new four-lane bridge being built adjacent to the north.

== Description ==
Overall, the Cache River Bridge is 375 feet 11.5 inches (114.6 m) in length, and the bridge's main span is 100 feet (30 m) in length and 24 feet (7.3 m) in width. Built at a 45-degree skew, the bridge's only span is rivet-connected and consists of 11 panels. The bridge is an excellent example of the Vincennes Bridge Company's later work, in contrast to the War Eagle Bridge in Northwest Arkansas.

== See also ==
- List of bridges documented by the Historic American Engineering Record in Arkansas
- List of bridges on the National Register of Historic Places in Arkansas
- National Register of Historic Places listings in Lawrence County, Arkansas
