= Brazil Clay County Airport =

- IATA: none; ICAO: none; FAA LID: 0I2

Summary
- Airport type: Public
- Owner: Brazil-Clay County BOAC
- Serves: Brazil, Indiana
- Elevation AMSL: 645 ft (197 m)
- Coordinates: 39°28′36″N 87°05′59″W

Map
- Location of airport in Clay County

Runways
Direction	Length		Surface
Direction	ft	m	Surface
9/27	2,941	896	Asphalt

Statistics (2010)
- Aircraft operations: 5,957
- Based aircraft: 17
- Source: Federal Aviation Administration

Brazil Clay County Airport (FAA LID: 0I2) is a public-use airport located three nautical miles (3.5 mi; 5.6 km) south of the central business district of Brazil, a city in Clay County, Indiana, United States. It is owned by the Brazil-Clay County BOAC.

== Facilities and aircraft ==
Brazil Clay County Airport covers an area of 70 acres (28 ha) at an elevation of 645 feet (197 m) above mean sea level. It has one runway designated 9/27 with an asphalt surface measuring 2,941 by 40 feet (896 by 12 m).

For the 12-month period ending December 31, 2010, the airport had 5,957 aircraft operations, an average of 16 per day: 98% general aviation and 2% air taxi. At that time there were 17 aircraft based at this airport: 94% single-engine and 6% helicopter.

== See also ==
- List of airports in Indiana
