= Gene Cramer =

American basketball player

Personal information
- Born: July 13, 1915 Indiana, U.S.
- Died: October 17, 1983 (aged 68) Brazil, Indiana, U.S.
- Listed height: 6 ft 1 in (1.85 m)
- Listed weight: 195 lb (88 kg)

Career information
- High school: Martinsville (Martinsville, Indiana)
- Playing career: 1933–1940
- Position: Center

Career history
- 1933–1934: Fort Wayne Oilers
- 1934–1935: Indianapolis
- 1935–1936: Columbus Noblitt Sharks
- 1936–1937: Indianapolis Inland
- 1937–1938: Indianapolis
- 1938–1941: Stewart-Warner
- 1940: Indianapolis Kautskys
- 1940: Indianapolis Secos

Crawford Eugene Cramer (July 13, 1915 – October 17, 1983), whose nickname is sometimes attributed to be Bill, was an American professional basketball player. He played for the Indianapolis Kautskys in the National Basketball League for one game during the 1939–40 season. Most of his basketball career was spent in semi-professional independent leagues during the 1930s. He won a national industrial league championship with Stewart-Warner in 1939–40.

In his post-basketball career, Cramer worked for United Oil Company. He died in Brazil, Indiana at age 68.
