= Indiana State Highway Bridge 42-11-3101 =

- U.S. National Register of Historic Places
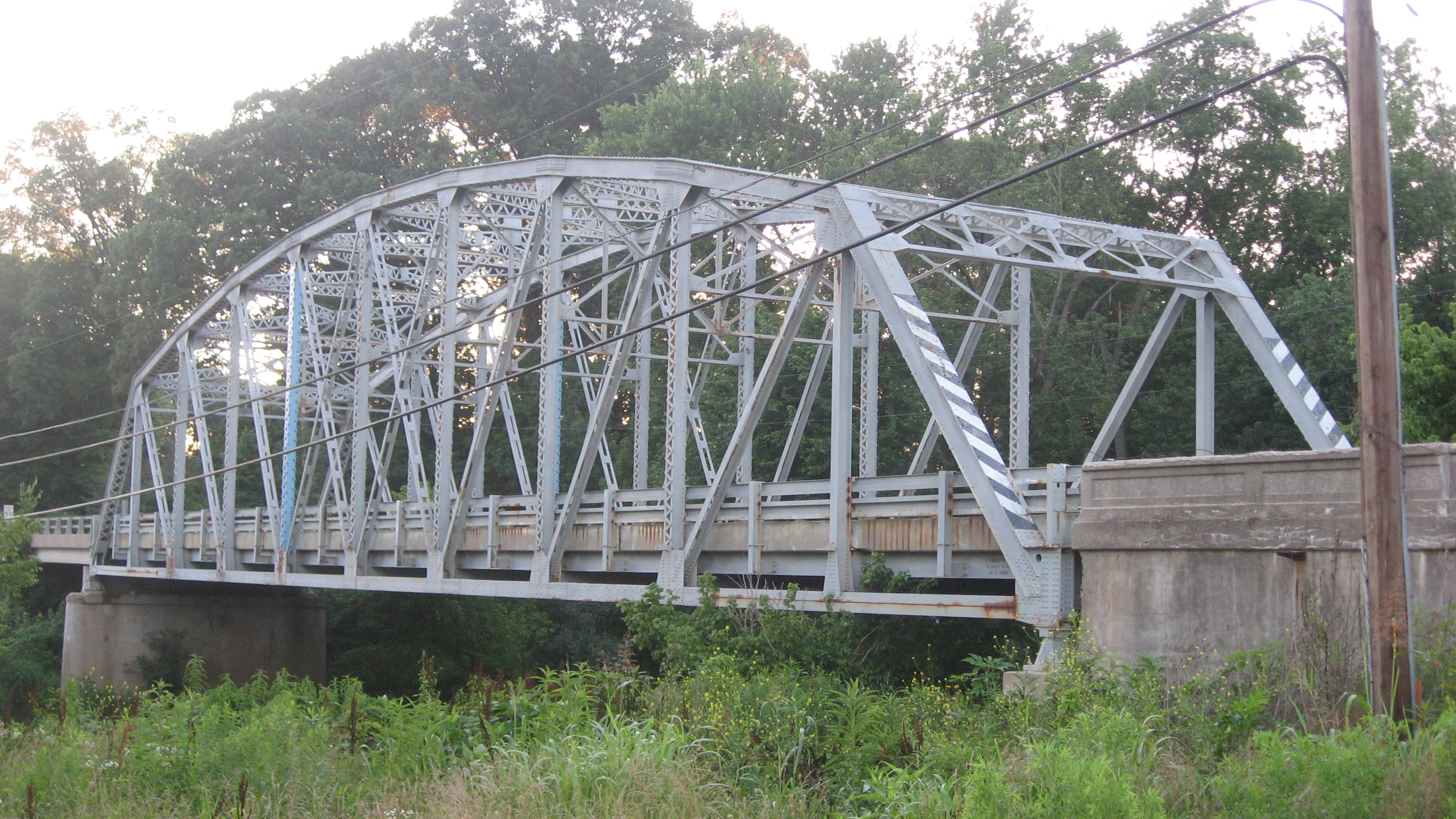
- Indiana State Highway Bridge 42-11-3101, July 2011

- Location within Clay County, Indiana Location within Indiana Location within the United States
- Location: State Road 42 over the Eel River, west of Poland, Cass Township, Clay County, Indiana
- Coordinates: 39°26′40″N 86°59′37″W
- Area: less than one acre
- Built: 1939
- Built by: Vincennes Bridge Company; R. McCalman, Inc.
- Architectural style: Parker through truss
- NRHP reference No.: 00000210
- Added to NRHP: March 15, 2000

Indiana State Highway Bridge 42-11-3101, also known as Poland Bridge, is a historic Parker through truss bridge located in Cass Township, Clay County, Indiana. It was built by the Vincennes Bridge Company and erected in 1939. It carries State Road 42 over the Eel River. It measures 175 feet long and rests on a concrete abutment and concrete pier. is truss bridge

It was added to the National Register of Historic Places in 2000.
