= Poland, Indiana =

Poland
- Unincorporated community Census designated place
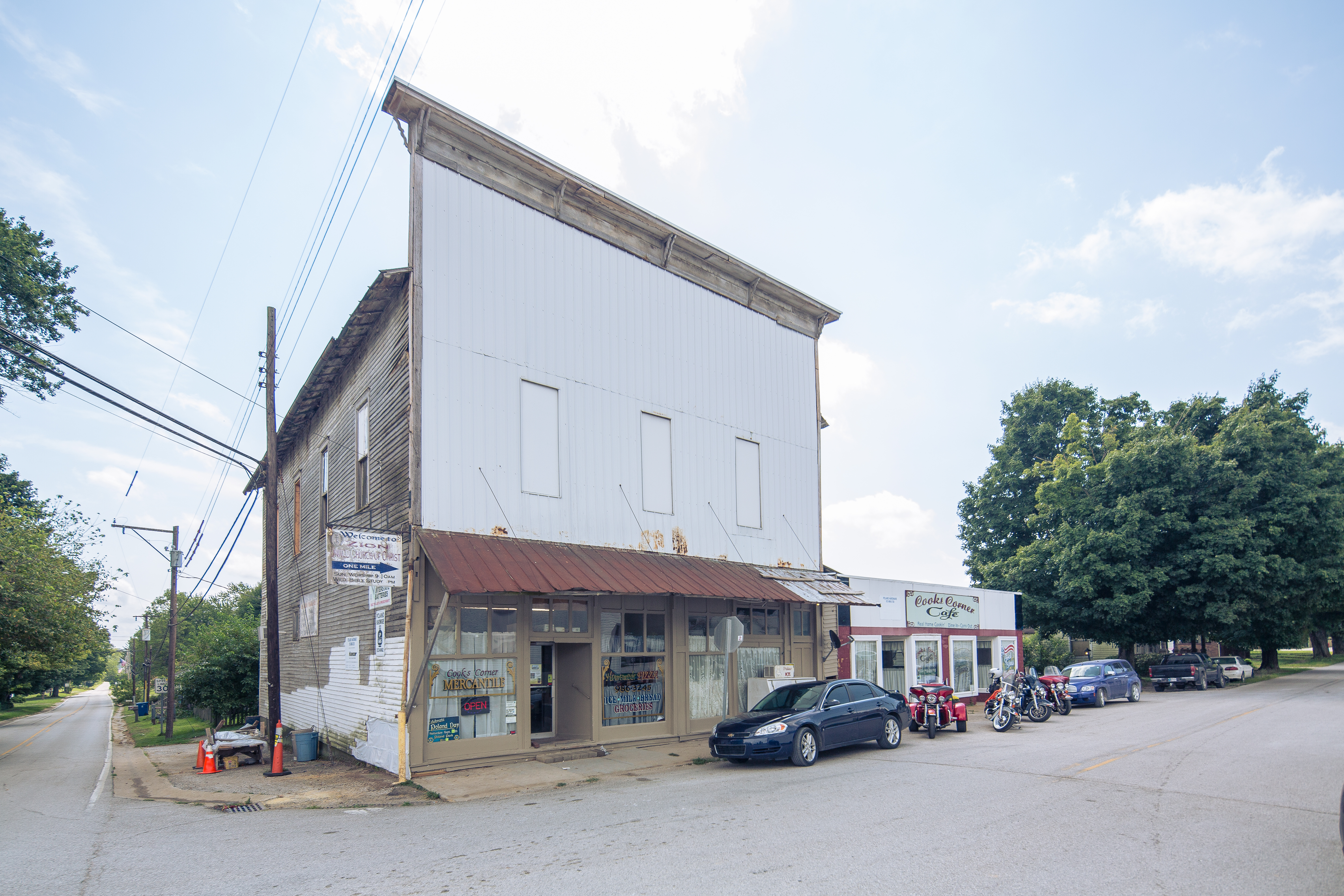

- Location in Clay County
- Coordinates: 39°26′39″N 86°57′3″W
- Country: United States
- State: Indiana
- County: Clay
- Township: Cass
- Elevation: 696 ft (212 m)
- Time zone: UTC-5.0 (Eastern (EST))
  - Summer (DST): UTC-4.0 (EDT)
- ZIP codes: 47868
- Area codes: 765 and 812
- GNIS feature ID: 441396

Poland is an unincorporated community in eastern Cass Township, Clay County, Indiana, United States. It lies along State Road 42 southeast of the city of Brazil, the county seat of Clay County.

Although Poland is unincorporated, it has a post office, with the ZIP code of 47868. The Poland post office was established in 1846. The zip code of 47868 has segments in three counties (Clay, Owen, and Putnam). Poland, Indiana is also in Owen County. The 47868 ZIP Code is centered in Owen County at latitude 39.451 and longitude -86.975. It is a standard type ZIP Code. Owen County is in the Eastern Time Zone (UTC -5 hours) and observes daylight saving time. ZIP Code Tabulation Area (ZCTA) 47868 has a land area of 58.11 sq. miles and a water area of 1.64 sq. miles for Census 2000.

== Demographics ==
The United States Census Bureau defined Pleasantville as a census designated place in the 2022 American Community Survey.

The community is part of the Terre Haute Metropolitan Statistical Area. The zip code 47868 is a rural community with 3,111 people as of the 2000 census, 47.6 persons per square mile.

== History ==
The first blacksmith shop in Poland, Indiana was owned by James A Poland, the year was 1839. In 1841 J.B. Nees conceived the idea of starting a town and with conversing with the 3 other land owners all agreed to set aside land, and Poland was born.

== Legend ==
In 2008, Poland was thrust into the limelight as the birthplace of a modern-day Noah's ark. The late Tom West, 71, and his wife of 52 years, Marsha, started building a 57-foot (17 m) long, 33-ton stainless steel sailboat on an old tennis court next to his house. "I know I'm not nuts but it's a big undertaking," West has been quoted as saying. Tom is a former tennis coach and farmer with several college degrees, including one in astrophysics. The interior of the boat is 6.5 feet (2.0 m) tall, and about 600 square feet (56 m^{2}), or about the size of a small apartment. West plans to build a full kitchen, sleeping quarters for 12 people, two bathrooms, a lounge and a navigation center. West has built the boat especially to resist attack by pirates. There are steel doors with locking mechanisms to assure protection. After completion, Tom and Marsha plan to launch the boat in Kentucky Lake, then take the Tombigbee waterway to the Gulf of Mexico, then on to see the world.

In 2001, Faith was launched in Cincinnati where she sailed down several rivers and channels to Mobile Bay in Alabama where she entered the Gulf. Tom and Marsha lived on Faith for seven years while he continued making interior improvements.

== Education ==
Patricksburg Elementary, Owen Valley Middle, Cloverdale High School.

Cloverdale High School is a public high school in Cloverdale. The principal of Cloverdale High School is Mr Sonny Stoltz. 408 students attend Cloverdale High School and are mostly White, non-Hispanic; Multiracial; and Hispanic. 100% of the Cloverdale High School students have limited English proficiency. 53% of the 408 students here have subsidized lunches. The student to teacher ratio at Cloverdale High School is 14:1. South Putnam High School is one of the nearest high schools.

Owen County Library OCPL has served Owen County for over 100 years.

== Owen County Government ==
Owen County Government was established by an act of the Indiana Legislature, 1818–1819, but was being settled as early as 1816. Indiana became a state in 1816, and was settled from the bottom up by land-hungry, adamantly independent Scotch-Irish, German and English folk with Appalachian frontier roots, including veterans of the American Revolution and the War of 1812. Comrades of Kentuckian Abraham Owen, who died in the Battle of Tippecanoe, named the county in his honor.

== Recreation ==
The Long House Lodge is a 9,000 square foot facility that opens up to a 50-acre private lake through a large, inviting porch. The lodge includes a large kitchen, dance floor, game room with a pool table, ping pong and fooseball. Outside the lodge is a large meadow that can be used for outdoor activities, and a large dock on the lake that could be used for a ceremony.

In 1952, Cagles Mill Lake was built as Indiana's first flood control reservoir, protecting the Eel and White river watersheds. Mill Creek feeds the 1,400-acre lake and is home to beautiful Cataract Falls. These falls resulted from two pre-glacial bedrock ridges buried beneath ancient lake sediments of the Illinoisan glacial period.
