= Indiana State Highway Bridge 46-11-1316 =

- Formerly listed on the U.S. National Register of Historic Places
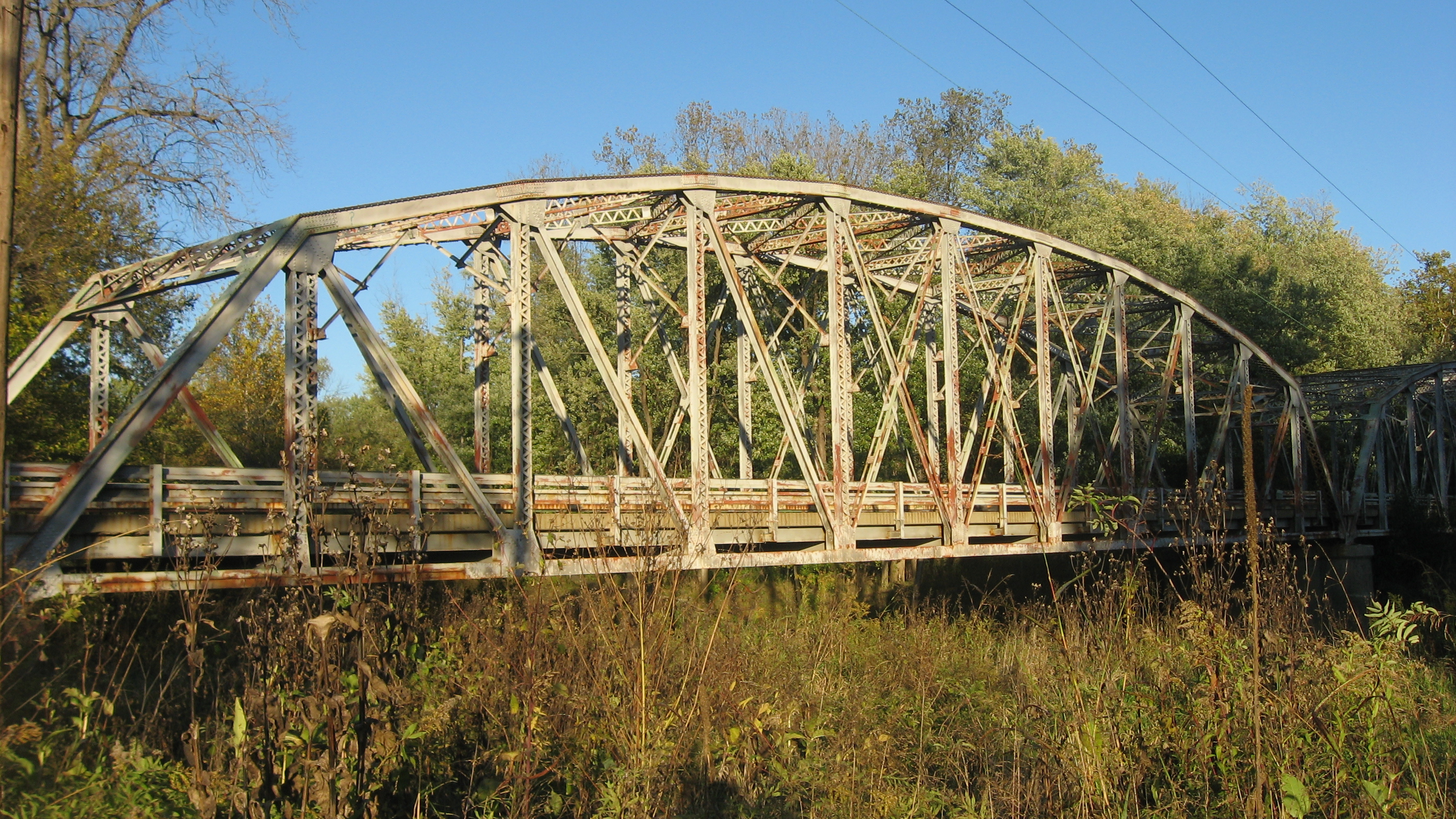
- Indiana State Highway Bridge 46-11-1316, October 2011

- Location within Clay County, Indiana Location within Indiana Location within the United States
- Location: State Road 46 over the Eel River at Bowling Green, Washington Township, Clay County, Indiana
- Coordinates: 39°23′3″N 87°1′14″W
- Area: less than one acre
- Built: 1939
- Built by: Vincennes Bridge Company
- Architectural style: Parker through truss
- NRHP reference No.: 00000211

Significant dates
- Added to NRHP: March 15, 2000
- Removed from NRHP: December 9, 2020

Indiana State Highway Bridge 46-11-1316, also known as Bowling Bridge, is a historic Parker through truss bridge located in Washington Township, Clay County, Indiana. It was built by the Vincennes Bridge Company and erected in 1939. It carries State Road 46 over the Eel River. It consists of two 196 foot long spans and rests on concrete abutments and a concrete pier.

It was added to the National Register of Historic Places in 2000, and was delisted in 2020.
