= Feeder Dam Bridge =

- U.S. National Register of Historic Places
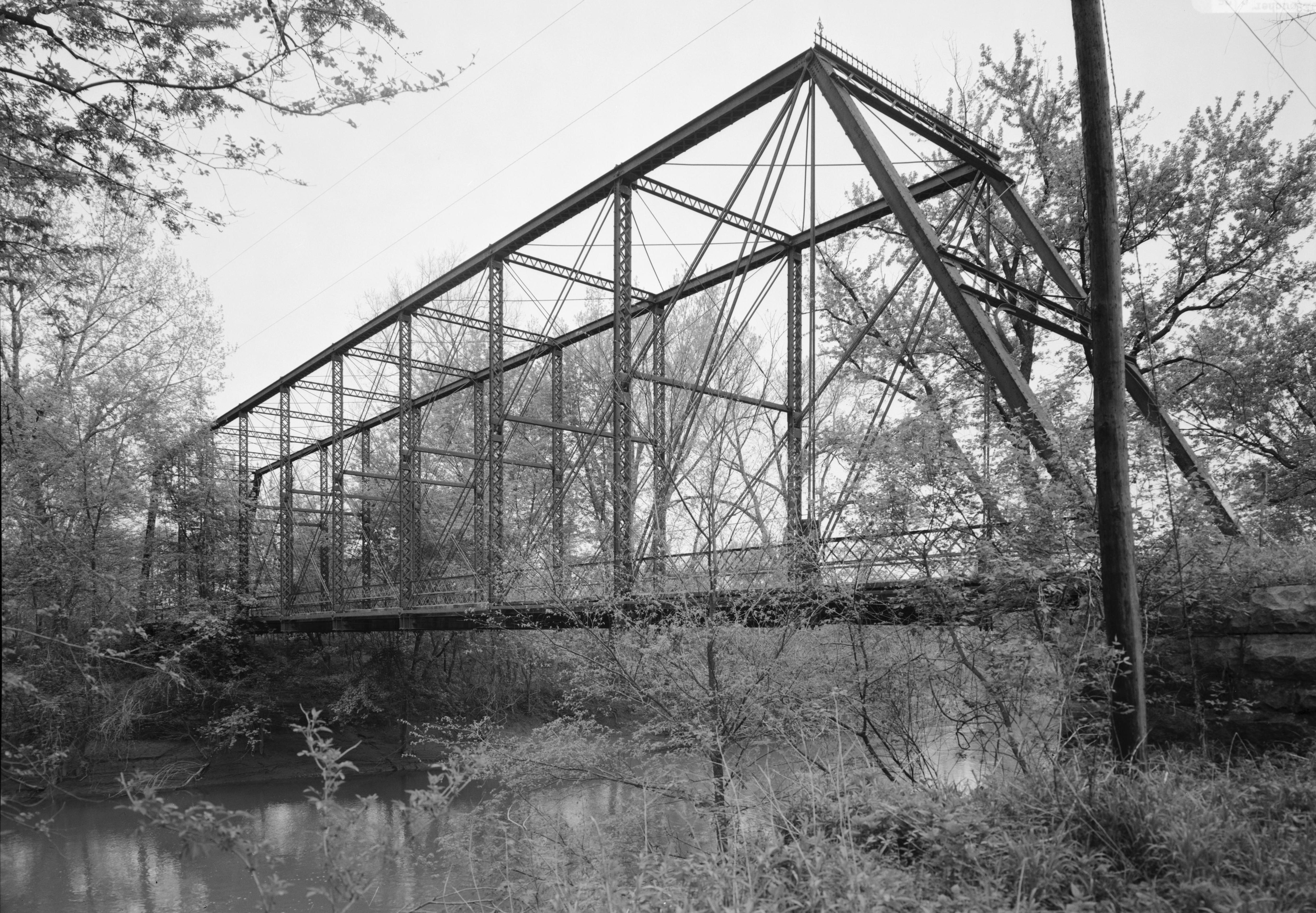
- Feeder Dam Bridge, April 1974

- Location within Clay County, Indiana Location within Indiana Location within the United States
- Location: Towpath Road over the Eel River, north of Clay City, Harrison Township and Sugar Ridge Township, Clay County, Indiana
- Coordinates: 39°20′09″N 87°06′49″W
- Area: less than one acre
- Built: 1894
- Built by: Hunt, C. F., Company
- Architectural style: Whipple through truss
- NRHP reference No.: 00000215
- Added to NRHP: March 15, 2000

Feeder Dam Bridge, also known as the Eel River Bridge and Clay County Bridge No. 208, is a historic Whipple through truss bridge located in Harrison Township and Sugar Ridge Township, Clay County, Indiana. It was built in 1894 and carries Towpath Road over the Eel River. It consists of a single 206-foot-long (63 m) span and rests on stone abutments.

It was added to the National Register of Historic Places in 2000.

== See also ==
- List of bridges documented by the Historic American Engineering Record in Indiana
