= Brazil Downtown Historic District =

Historic district in Indiana, United States

- U.S. National Register of Historic Places
- U.S. Historic district
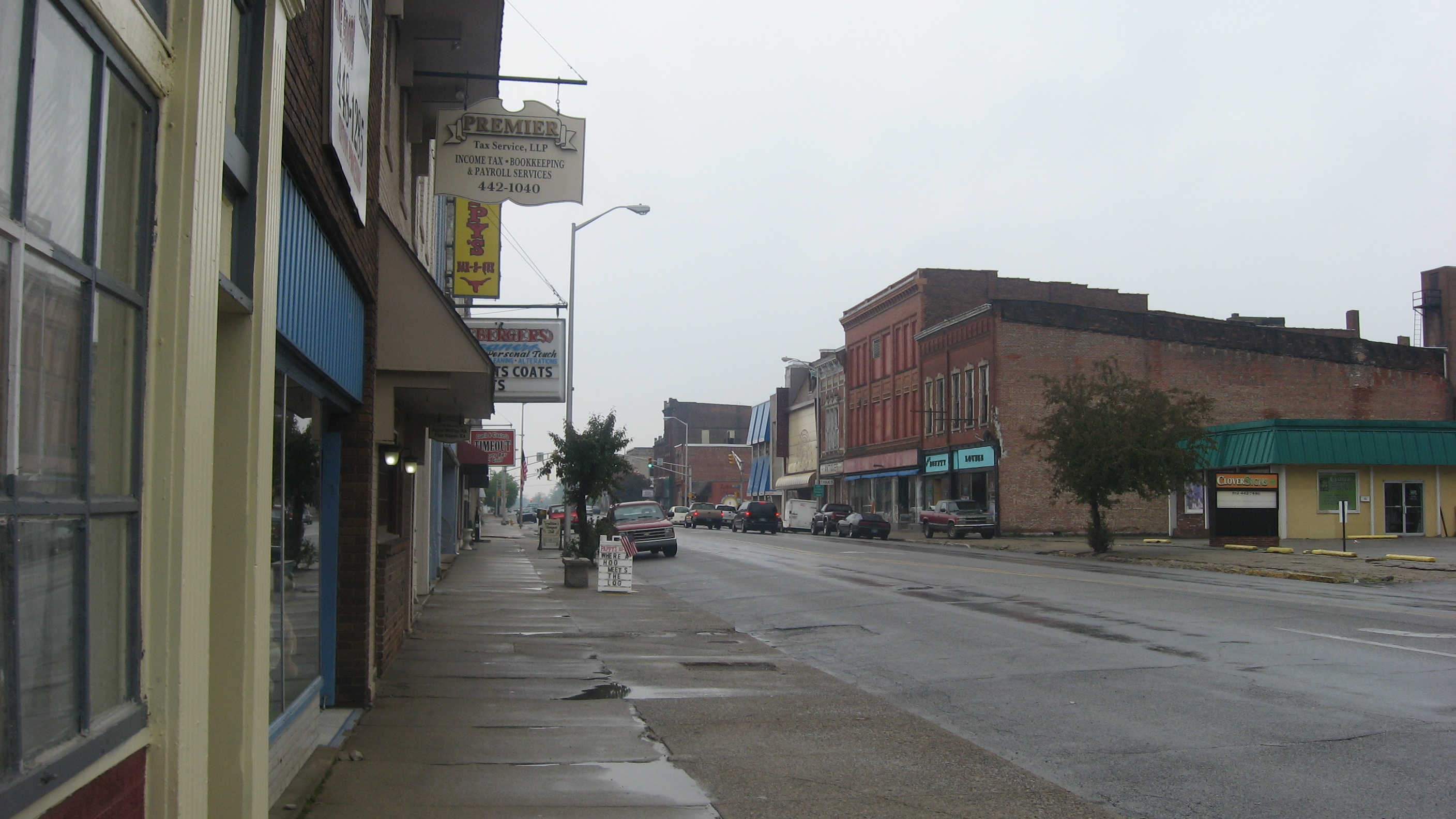
- Brazil Downtown Historic District, April 2012

- Location within Clay County, Indiana Location within Indiana Location within the United States
- Location: E. and W. National Ave. between Depot and Forest Aves., Brazil, Indiana
- Coordinates: 39°31′26″N 87°7′33″W
- Area: 15.2 acres (6.2 ha)
- Architect: Taylor, James Knox; Fletcher, George A.
- Architectural style: Renaissance, Romanesque, Italianate
- NRHP reference No.: 97000601
- Added to NRHP: June 25, 1997

Brazil Downtown Historic District is a national historic district located at Brazil, Indiana. The district encompasses 35 contributing buildings and two contributing objects in the central business district of Brazil. The district developed between about 1875 and 1935, and includes notable examples of Italianate, Romanesque Revival, and Renaissance Revival style architecture. Located in the district is the separately listed United States Post Office. Other notable buildings include the Sinclair Oil Gas Station (c. 1935), Lark Theater (1922, 1958), Citizens Bank Building (c. 1910), Brazil Trust Company (c. 1915), D.H. Davis Building (1909), and Telephone Building (c. 1925).

It was added to the National Register of Historic Places in 1997.
