= Poland Presbyterian Church and Cemetery =

Historic site in Clay County, Indiana, US

- U.S. National Register of Historic Places
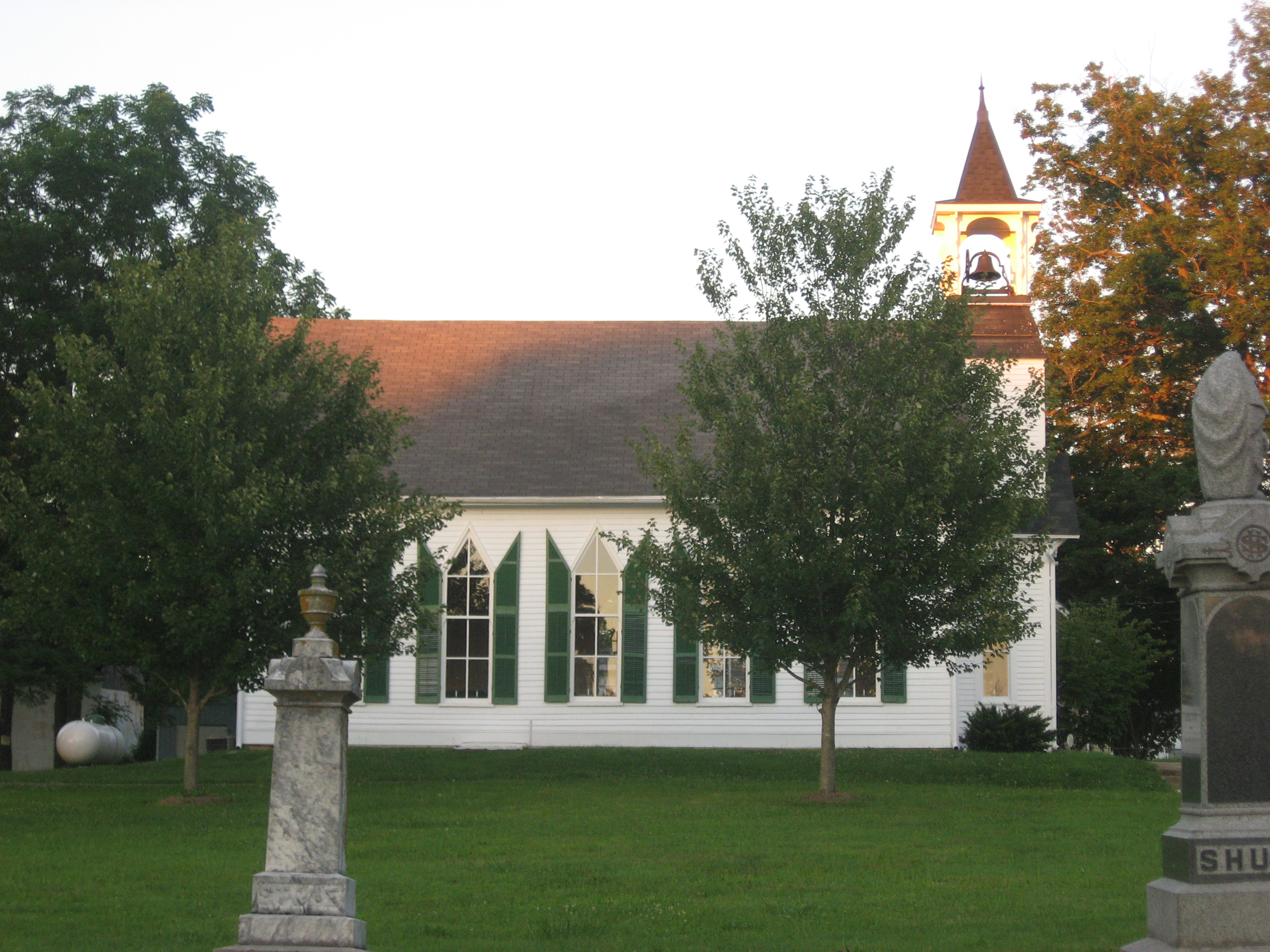

- Location within Clay County, Indiana Location within Indiana Location within the United States
- Location: State Road 42 near County Road 56S at Poland, Cass Township, Clay County, Indiana
- Coordinates: 39°26′41″N 86°57′14″W
- Area: 6.8 acres (2.8 ha)
- Built: 1869, 1893
- Architectural style: Gothic, Gothic Revival, Gable-front, Other
- NRHP reference No.: 90001932
- Added to NRHP: December 18, 1990

Poland Presbyterian Church and Cemetery, also known as Poland Historical Chapel and Poland Cemetery, is a historic Presbyterian church and cemetery on IN 42 near Co. Rd. 56S in Cass Township, Clay County, Indiana. It was built in 1869, and is a gable-front, vernacular frame building with Gothic Revival style design elements. It has a high pitched roof and triangular upper sashes. A vestibule and tower were added in 1893. The adjacent cemetery was founded in 1886, and includes nearly 400 headstones.

It was added to the National Register of Historic Places in 1990.
