= Aqueduct Bridge (Clay City, Indiana) =

- U.S. National Register of Historic Places
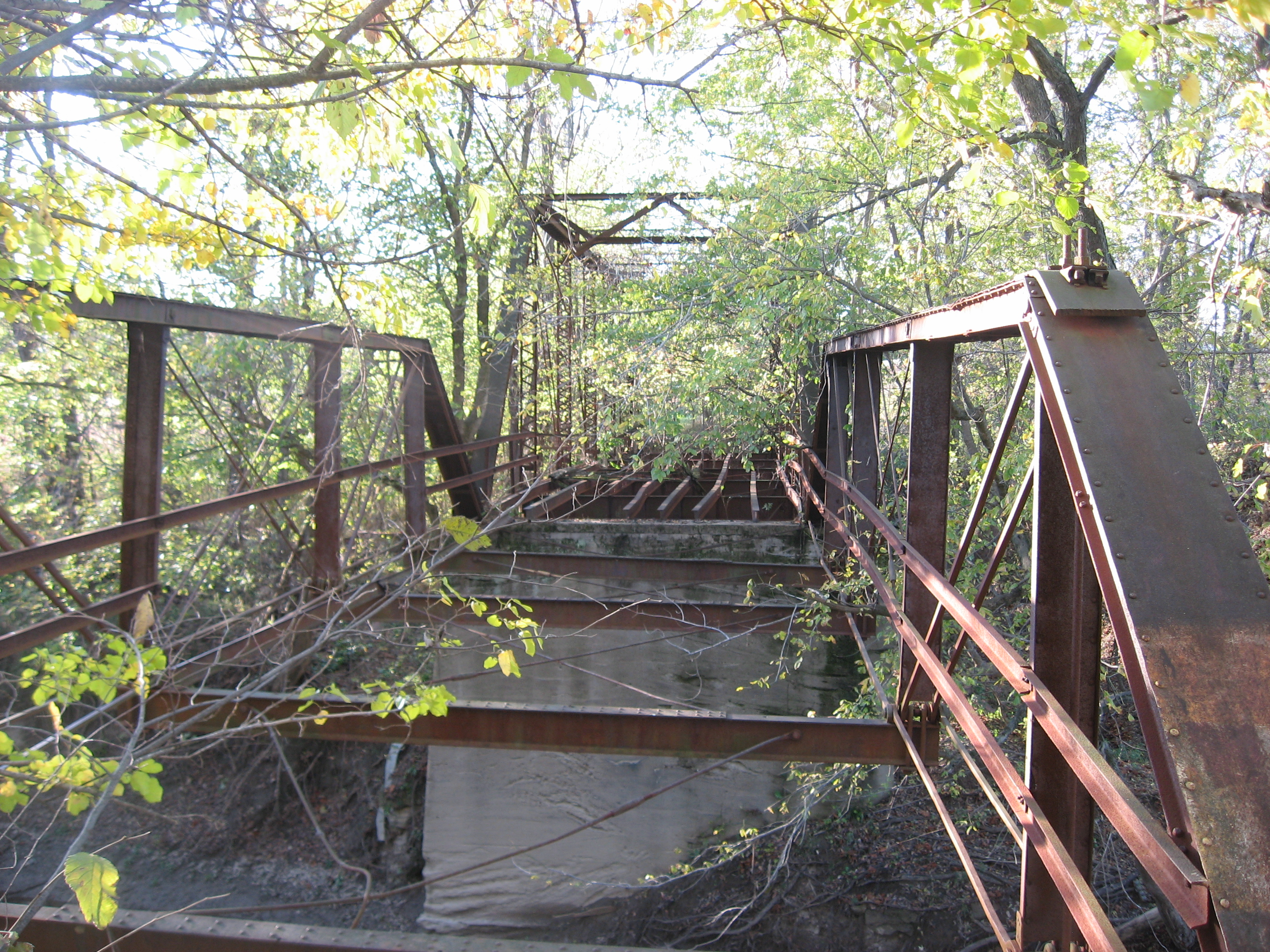
- Aqueduct Bridge, October 2011

- Location within Clay County, Indiana Location within Indiana Location within the United States
- Location: Towpath Rd. over Birch Creek, northwest of Clay City, Perry Township and Sugar Ridge Township, Clay County, Indiana
- Coordinates: 39°19′36″N 87°10′46″W
- Area: less than one acre
- Built: 1880, 1920
- Built by: Cleveland Bridge and Iron Company; Vincennes Bridge Company
- Architectural style: Pratt through truss
- NRHP reference No.: 00000209
- Added to NRHP: March 15, 2000

Aqueduct Bridge, also known as the Coffey Bridge and Clay County Bridge #182, is a historic Pratt through truss and Pratt pony truss bridge located in Perry Township and Sugar Ridge Township, Clay County, Indiana. The original span was built by the Cleveland Bridge and Iron Company in 1880 and the second section by the Vincennes Bridge Company in 1920. It carries Towpath Road over Birch Creek. The original span measures 60 feet (18 m) and the second span 102 feet (31 m) long. They rest on concrete abutments and a central pier.

It was added to the National Register of Historic Places in 2000.
