= Bowling Green, Indiana =

Bowling Green
- Unincorporated town
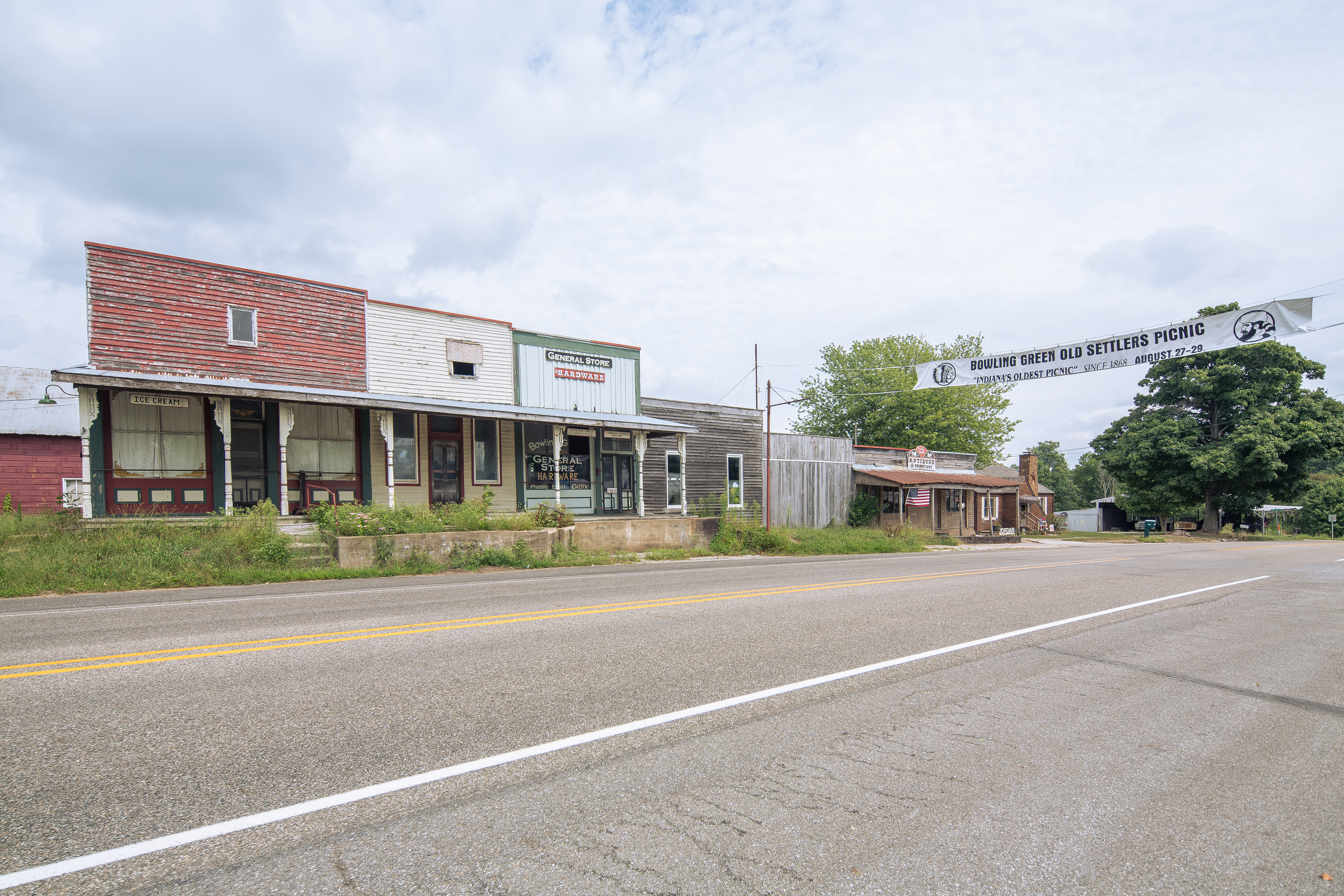

- Location in Clay County
- Coordinates: 39°22′59″N 87°00′42″W
- Country: United States
- State: Indiana
- County: Clay
- Township: Washington
- Elevation: 653 ft (199 m)
- Time zone: UTC-5:00 (EST)
  - Summer (DST): UTC-5:00 (EDT)
- ZIP code: 47833
- Area code: 812
- FIPS code: 18-06832
- GNIS feature ID: 431404

Bowling Green is an unincorporated town in Washington Township, Clay County, Indiana. It is part of the Terre Haute Metropolitan Statistical Area.

== History ==
The town was probably named after Bowling Green, Virginia. The first post office was established at Bowling Green in 1825. With the establishment of Clay County in the same year, Bowling Green became the site of the county's first courthouse, which was completed in 1828. Bowling Green was incorporated as a town in 1869, but subsequently lost its status as county seat to the town of Brazil in 1876.

== Demographics ==
Historical population
Census	Pop.	Note	%±
1850	318		—
1860	466		46.5%
1870	606		30.0%
1880	572		−5.6%
1890	467		−18.4%
1900	432		−7.5%
1910	336		−22.2%
1920	273		−18.7%
1930	257		−5.9%
1940	219		−14.8%
1950	235		7.3%
1960	229		−2.6%
U.S. Decennial Census

Bowling Green appeared on U.S. Census returns between 1850 and 1960. Its population peaked in 1870, when it had a reported 606 inhabitants.

The United States Census Bureau delineated Bowling Green as a census designated place in the 2022 American Community Survey.

== Notable people ==
- George N. Beamer, judge of the United States District Court for the Northern District of Indiana and 30th Indiana Attorney General.
