= Cass Township, Clay County, Indiana =

Cass Township
- Township
- Location of Cass Township in Clay County
- Coordinates: 39°26′59″N 86°58′49″W
- Country: United States
- State: Indiana
- County: Clay

Government
  - Type: Indiana township

Area
  - Total: 12 sq mi (31 km^{2})
  - Land: 12 sq mi (31 km^{2})
  - Water: 0 sq mi (0 km^{2})
- Elevation: 581 ft (177 m)

Population (2020)
  - Total: 346
  - Density: 29/sq mi (11/km^{2})
- FIPS code: 18-10666
- GNIS feature ID: 453162

Cass Township is one of eleven townships in Clay County, Indiana. As of the 2020 census, its population was 346 (slightly down from 347 at 2010) and it contained 148 housing units.

== History ==
Cass Township was organized in the 1840s. It was named for Lewis Cass.

The Indiana State Highway Bridge 42-11-3101 and Poland Presbyterian Church and Cemetery are listed on the National Register of Historic Places.

== Geography ==
According to the 2010 census, the township has a total area of 12 square miles (31 km^{2}), all land.

=== Unincorporated towns ===
- Hirt Corner
- Poland

(This list is based on USGS data and may include former settlements.)

=== Adjacent townships ===
- Washington Township, Putnam County (north)
- Jackson Township, Owen County (east)
- Washington Township (south)
- Jackson Township (west)

=== Major highways ===
- Indiana State Road 42

=== Cemeteries ===
The township contains 13 cemeteries: Cagle, Neir, Wilkinson-Nees, Poland Chapel, [Unnamed]. Anderson, Cromwell, Rizley, Old Mace, Dyer-Schopple, Syster, Union, & Latham-Lucas.
