= Washington Township, Clay County, Indiana =

Washington Township
- Township
- Location of Washington Township in Clay County
- Coordinates: 39°23′09″N 86°59′42″W
- Country: United States
- State: Indiana
- County: Clay

Government
  - Type: Indiana township

Area
  - Total: 36.73 sq mi (95.1 km^{2})
  - Land: 36.73 sq mi (95.1 km^{2})
  - Water: 0 sq mi (0 km^{2})
- Elevation: 666 ft (203 m)

Population (2020)
  - Total: 750
  - Density: 20/sq mi (7.9/km^{2})
- FIPS code: 18-80468
- GNIS feature ID: 453988

Washington Township is one of eleven townships in Clay County, Indiana. As of the 2020 census, its population was 750 (down from 780 at 2010) and it contained 346 housing units.

== History ==
Indiana State Highway Bridge 46-11-1316 was listed on the National Register of Historic Places in 2000.

== Geography ==
According to the 2010 census, the township has a total area of 36.73 square miles (95.1 km^{2}), all land.

=== Unincorporated towns ===
- Bowling Green

(This list is based on USGS data and may include former settlements.)

=== Adjacent townships ===
- Cass Township (north)
- Jackson Township, Owen County (northeast)
- Morgan Township, Owen County (east)
- Marion Township, Owen County (south)
- Harrison Township (southwest)
- Sugar Ridge Township (west)
- Jackson Township (northwest)

=== Major highways ===
- Indiana State Road 46

=== Cemeteries ===
The township contains six cemeteries: Fairview, Funk, Killion, Sixmile, Snoddy and Zenor.
