= United States Post Office (Brazil, Indiana) =

- US Post Office-Brazil
- U.S. National Register of Historic Places
- U.S. Historic district – Contributing property
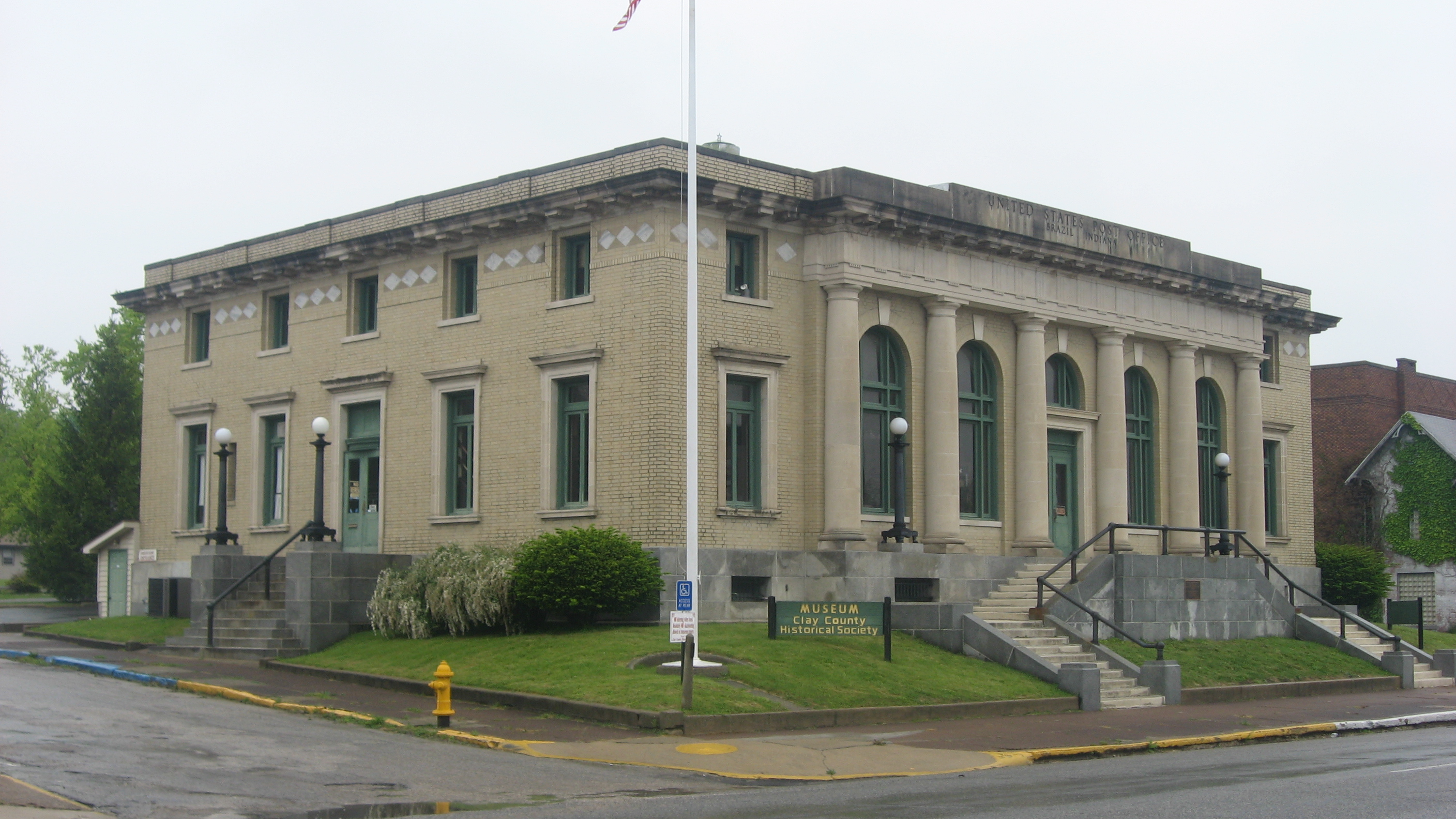
- Post office in Brazil, Indiana, April 2012

- Location within Clay County, Indiana Location within Indiana Location within the United States
- Location: 100 E. National Ave., Brazil, Indiana
- Coordinates: 39°31′26″N 87°7′33″W
- Area: less than one acre
- Built: 1911-1913
- Architect: Taylor, James Knox
- Architectural style: Classical Revival
- NRHP reference No.: 94001132
- Added to NRHP: September 8, 1994

US Post Office-Brazil is a historic post office building located at Brazil, Indiana. It was designed by the Office of the Supervising Architect under James Knox Taylor and built in 1911–1913 in the Classical Revival style. It is a two-story, brick building over a raised granite faced basement. The front facade features a blind colonnade with six Tuscan order columns of Indiana limestone. It has a hipped roof hidden from view by a parapet.

It has housed the Clay County Historical Society Museum since 1980.

It was added to the National Register of Historic Places in 1994. It is located in the Brazil Downtown Historic District.

== See also ==
- List of United States post offices
