= Meridian–Forest Historic District =

Historic district in Indiana, United States

- U.S. National Register of Historic Places
- U.S. Historic district
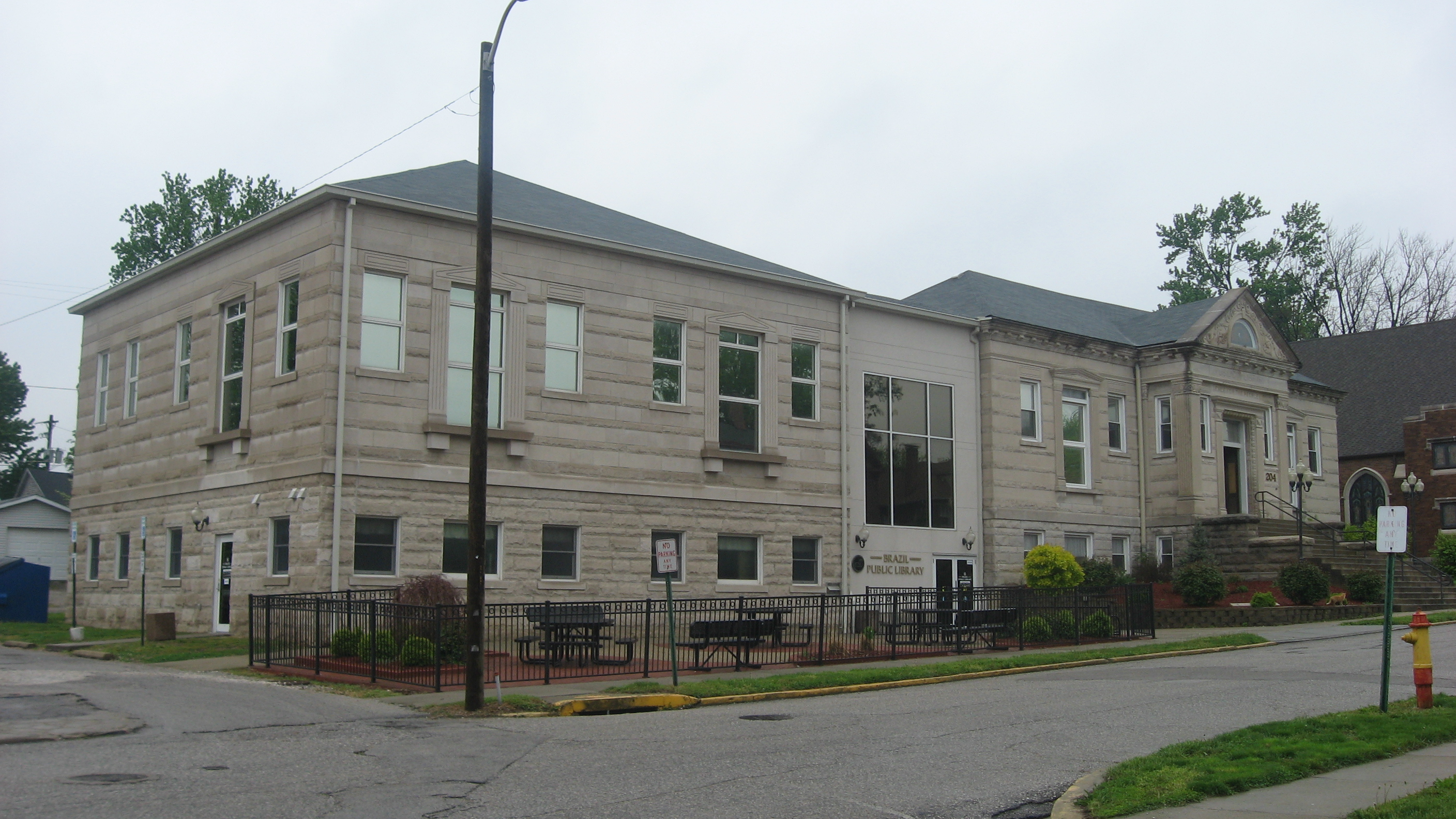
- Carnegie Library in Brazil, April 2012

- Location within Clay County, Indiana Location within Indiana Location within the United States
- Location: Roughly bounded by N. Meridian, E. Chestnut, N. Forest, E. and W. Church, and State Sts., Brazil, Indiana
- Coordinates: 39°31′27.6″N 87°7′42.5″W
- Area: 69.8 acres (28.2 ha)
- Architect: McGuire & Shook; Brubaker & Stern
- Architectural style: Queen Anne, Romanesque, Italianate
- NRHP reference No.: 97000600
- Added to NRHP: June 26, 1997

Meridian–Forest Historic District is a national historic district located at Brazil, Indiana. The district encompasses 220 contributing buildings and 13 contributing structures in a predominantly residential section of Brazil. The district developed between about 1866 and 1940, and includes notable examples of Italianate, Romanesque Revival, and Queen Anne style architecture. The district is characterized by brick streets and alleys. Notable buildings include the First Methodist Church, First Presbyterian Church, Masonic Lodge, Carnegie Library, and Brazil Junior High School.

It was added to the National Register of Historic Places in 1997.
