= Clay County Hospital =

- U.S. National Register of Historic Places
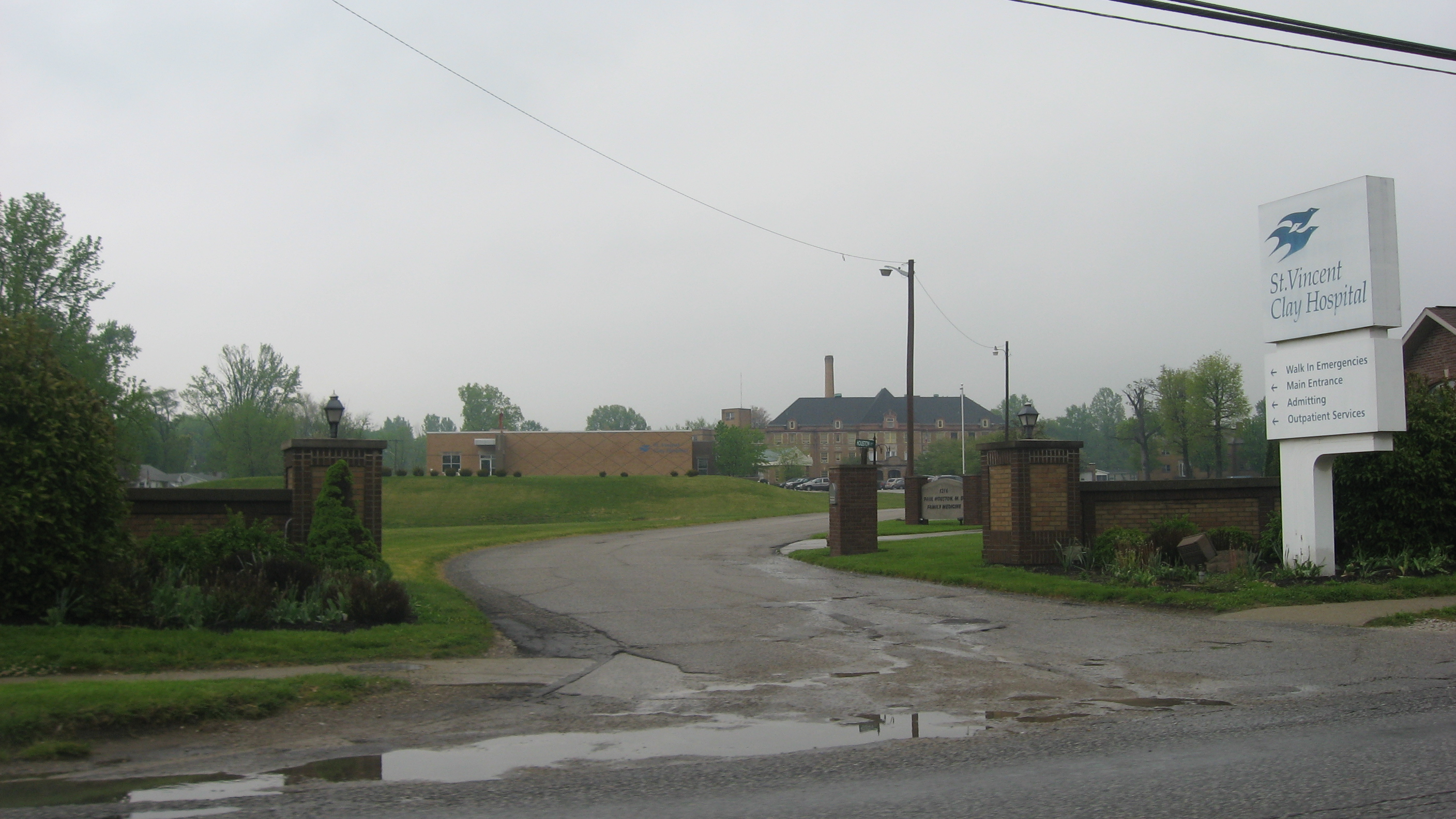
- Clay County Hospital, April 2012

- Location within Clay County, Indiana Location within Indiana Location within the United States
- Location: 1200 E. National Ave., Brazil, Indiana
- Coordinates: 39°31′43.1″N 87°6′43.3″W
- Area: 6 acres (2.4 ha)
- Built: 1927-1928
- Architect: Leonard, R. W.
- Architectural style: Colonial Revival
- NRHP reference No.: 99001154
- Added to NRHP: October 1, 1999

Clay County Hospital is a historic hospital located at Brazil, Indiana. It was built in 1927–1928, and is a 3 1/2-story, tan brick Colonial Revival style building. It is limestone trim and a slate hipped roof. Also on the property are the contributing former nurses residence (1947), original entrance, and two brick corner posts.

It was added to the National Register of Historic Places in 1999.
