= Tide Water Pumping Station =

- U.S. National Register of Historic Places
- U.S. Historic district
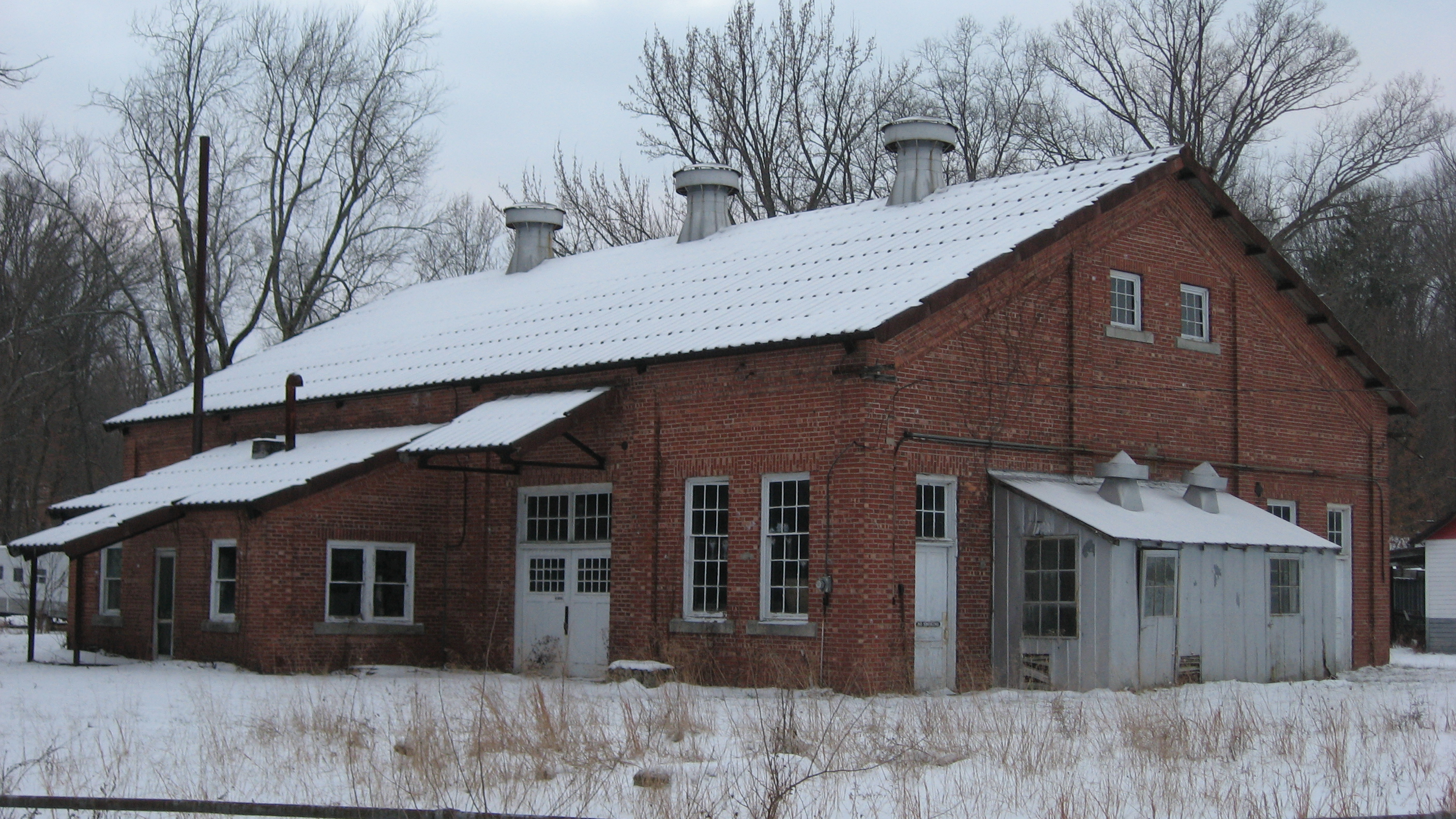
- Tide Water Pumping Station main building, December 2010

- Location within Clay County, Indiana Location within Indiana Location within the United States
- Location: Southwestern corner of the junction of 900S and 300E, north of Coal City, Harrison Township, Clay County, Indiana
- Coordinates: 39°15′16″N 87°03′21″W
- Area: 12.5 acres (5.1 ha)
- Built: 1915
- Architect: George J. Hanks
- Architectural style: Queen Anne
- NRHP reference No.: 99001076
- Added to NRHP: September 3, 1999

Tide Water Pumping Station, also known as Benton Station and SOHIO Pumping Station, is a historic pumping station complex and national historic district located in Harrison Township, Clay County, Indiana. The complex includes the 1 1/2-story, brick gale roofed pump house (1915); frame warehouse; a metal shed; two Queen Anne style dwellings; a metal garage; a concrete sluice and bridges; and the remains of a tennis court, dam and pond, and buried pipes. It is one of 14 pumping stations built along a 546.16 mile oil pipeline built between Crawford County, Illinois and Rixford, Pennsylvania. The station closed about 1957.

It was added to the National Register of Historic Places in 1999.
