= Harrison Township, Clay County, Indiana =

Harrison Township
- Township
- Location of Harrison Township in Clay County
- Coordinates: 39°16′10″N 87°06′37″W
- Country: United States
- State: Indiana
- County: Clay

Government
  - Type: Indiana township

Area
  - Total: 62.67 sq mi (162.3 km^{2})
  - Land: 62.24 sq mi (161.2 km^{2})
  - Water: 0.43 sq mi (1.1 km^{2})
- Elevation: 604 ft (184 m)

Population (2020)
  - Total: 2,151
  - Density: 34.56/sq mi (13.34/km^{2})
- FIPS code: 18-31684
- GNIS feature ID: 453381

Harrison Township is one of eleven townships in Clay County, Indiana. As of the 2020 census, its population was 2,151 (slightly down from 2,172 at 2010) and it contained 1,025 housing units.

== History ==
The Feeder Dam Bridge and Tide Water Pumping Station are listed on the National Register of Historic Places.

== Geography ==
According to the 2010 census, the township has a total area of 62.67 square miles (162.3 km^{2}), of which 62.24 square miles (161.2 km^{2}) (or 99.31%) is land and 0.43 square miles (1.1 km^{2}) (or 0.69%) is water.

=== Cities and towns ===
- Clay City

=== Unincorporated towns ===
- Barrick Corner
- Eel River
- New Brunswick

(This list is based on USGS data and may include former settlements.)

=== Adjacent townships ===
- Sugar Ridge Township (north)
- Washington Township (northeast)
- Marion Township, Owen County (east)
- Jefferson Township, Owen County (southeast)
- Smith Township, Greene County (south)
- Lewis Township (southwest)
- Perry Township (northwest)

=== Major highways ===
- Indiana State Road 59
- Indiana State Road 157
- Indiana State Road 246

=== Cemeteries ===
The township contains nine cemeteries: Cole, Duncan, Goshorn Memorial Park, Greenwell, Liechty, Maple Grove, Maple Grove, Sink and Wilson.
