= Clay County Courthouse (Indiana) =

- U.S. National Register of Historic Places
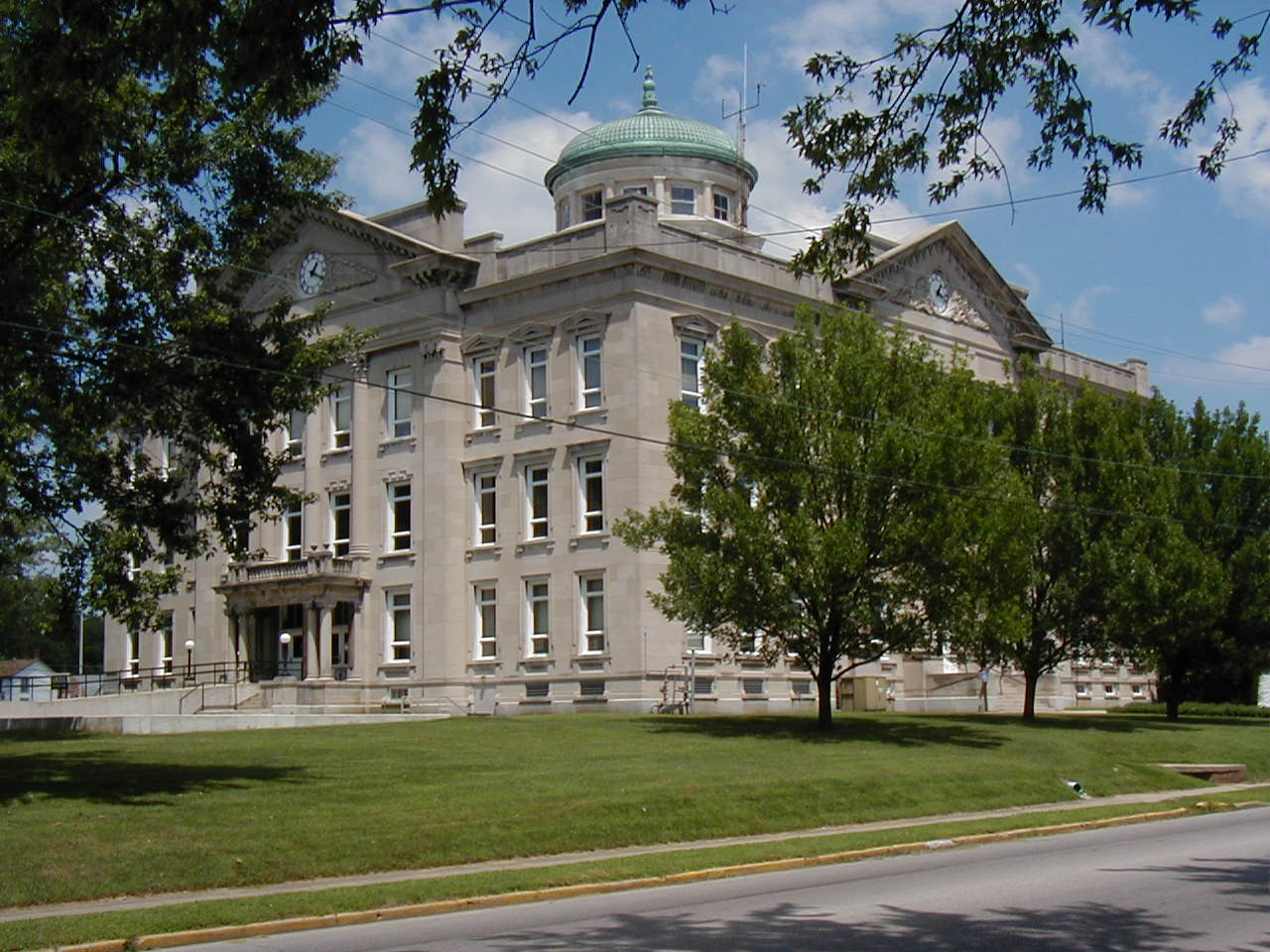
- Clay County Courthouse, August 2001

- Location within Clay County, Indiana Location within Indiana Location within the United States
- Location: Bounded by US 40, Harrison, Jackson, and Alabama Sts., Brazil, Indiana
- Coordinates: 39°31′28.8″N 87°7′9.6″W
- Area: 1.9 acres (0.77 ha)
- Built: 1914
- Architect: Gaddis, John W.
- Architectural style: Classical Revival
- NRHP reference No.: 99001109
- Added to NRHP: September 9, 1999

Clay County Courthouse is a historic courthouse located at Brazil, Indiana. It was designed by noted Indiana architect John W. Gaddis and built in 1914 in the Classical Revival style. It is a three-story, limestone building over a raised basement. It features a multi-tiered parapet with clock faces within a decorative tympanum and a two-story dome atop the flat roof. The interior has a rotunda with stained glass octahedral dome.

It was added to the National Register of Historic Places in 1999.

In 2001, a historical marker was erected on 609 E. National Road/US 40, Brazil.
