= Brazil, Indiana =

- City
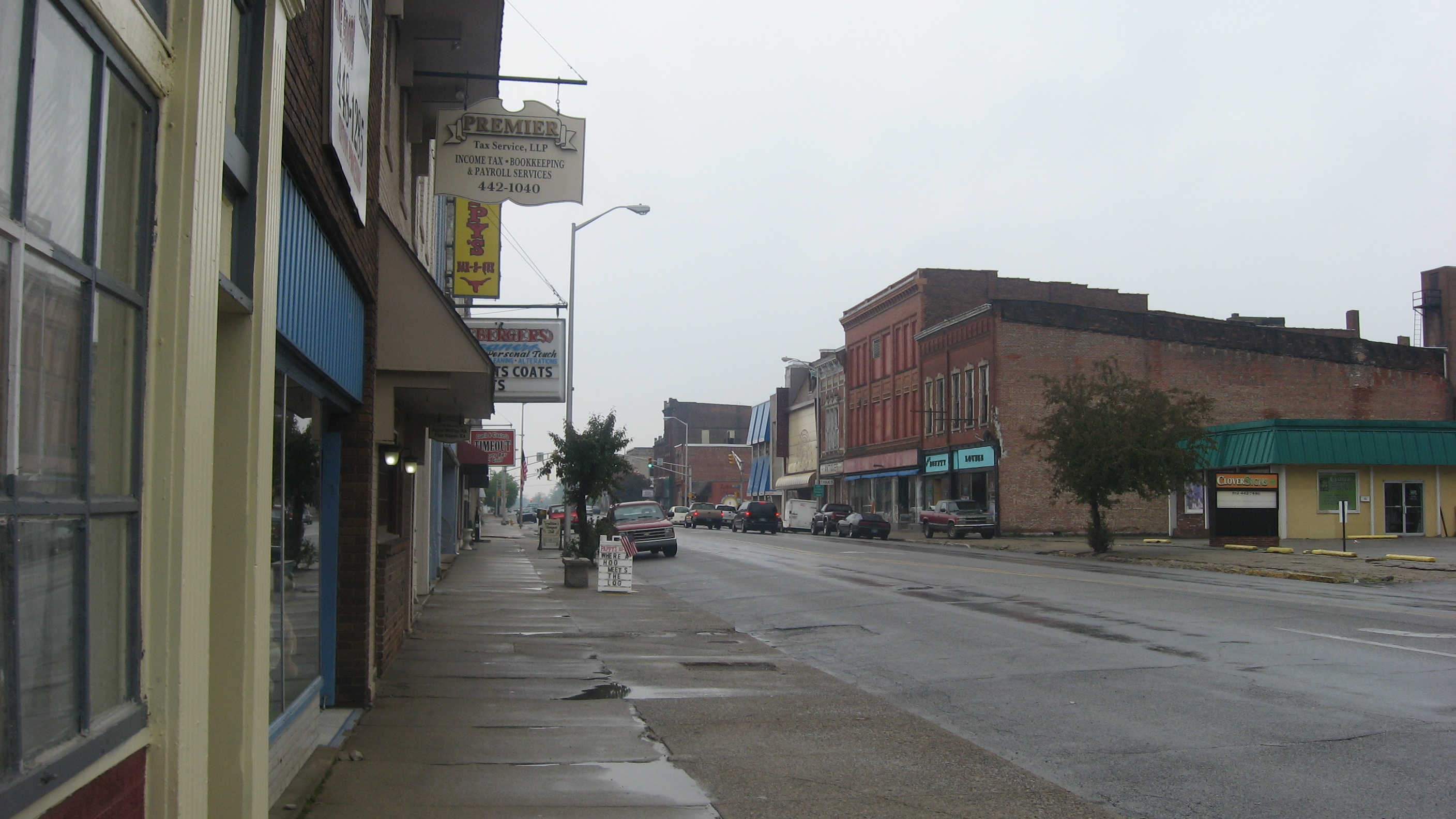
- Downtown Brazil

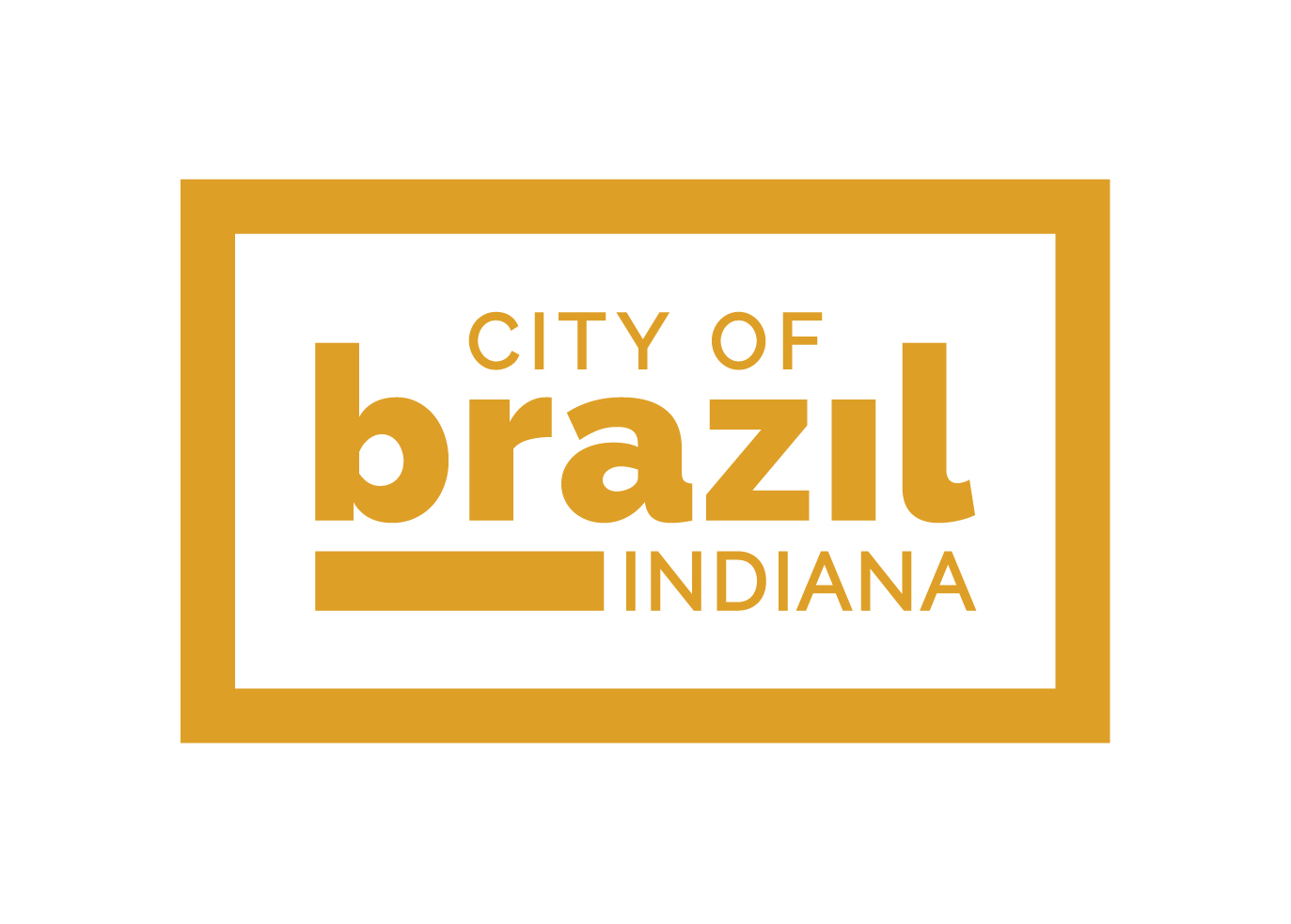
- Logo

- Location of Brazil in Clay County, Indiana.
- Coordinates: 39°31′30″N 87°07′39″W
- Country: United States
- State: Indiana
- County: Clay
- Townships: Brazil, Jackson, Dick Johnson, Posey

Government
  - Mayor: Brian Wyndham (D)

Area
  - Total: 3.72 sq mi (9.63 km^{2})
  - Land: 3.69 sq mi (9.55 km^{2})
  - Water: 0.031 sq mi (0.08 km^{2})
- Elevation: 660 ft (200 m)

Population (2020)
  - Total: 8,181
  - Density: 2,220/sq mi (857/km^{2})
- Time zone: UTC-5 (EST)
  - Summer (DST): UTC-4 (EDT)
- ZIP code: 47834
- Area code: 812
- FIPS code: 18-07174
- GNIS ID: 431462
- Website: Official website

Brazil is a city in Clay County, Indiana, United States. The population was 8,181 at the 2020 census. The city is the county seat of Clay County. It is part of the Terre Haute metropolitan area. There is a fountain from the country of Brazil; Brazil often flies the Brazilian, Indiana flag, and U.S. flag alongside one another at the fountain.

== History ==
In the 1840s, the owners of the farmland that would later become the city of Brazil decided to name their farm after the country of Brazil. The city was founded in 1866. As of 2024, Brazil is part of the Terre Haute Metropolitan Statistical Area. Clay County, formed in 1825, originally had Bowling Green as its county seat. The county seat was relocated to Brazil in 1876 following the city's development.

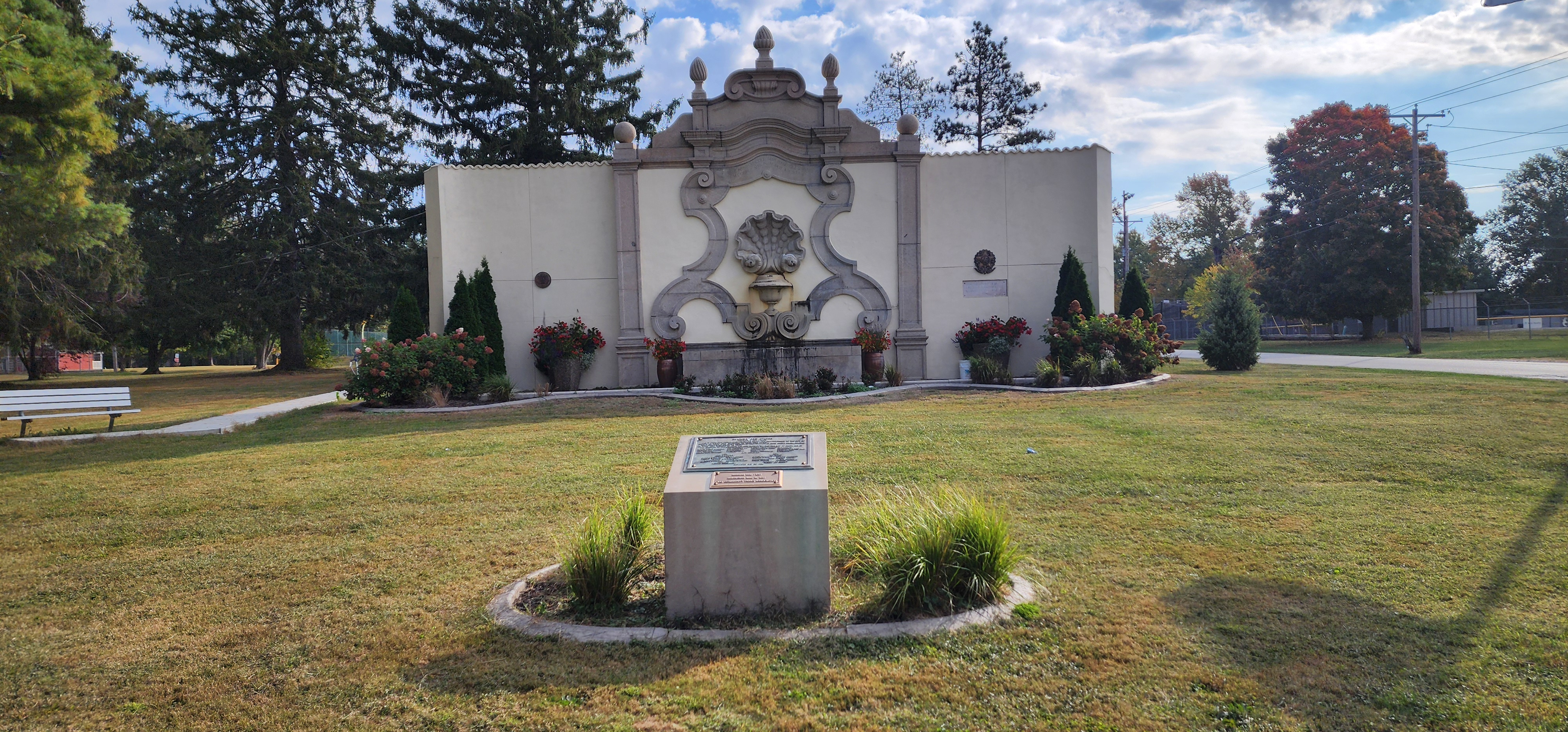
The Chafariz dos Contos Fountain

The Chafariz dos Contos Fountain (from "contos de réis" a former Brazilian currency) was given to the city by the country of Brazil as a symbol of friendship in 1956. It is a replica of the original fountain located in Ouro Preto, State of Minas Gerais, Brazil, built in 1745.

In 2010, Brazil gained national attention for accepting money from Kentucky Fried Chicken for the rights to display the KFC and Fiery Grilled Wings logos on city fire hydrants.

The Brazil Downtown Historic District, Clay County Courthouse, Clay County Hospital, Meridian-Forest Historic District, and U.S. Post Office-Brazil are listed on the National Register of Historic Places.

== Geography ==
Brazil is located at 39°31′30″N 87°7′39″W (39.525000, -87.127500).

According to the 2010 census, Brazil has a total area of 3.058 square miles (7.92 km^{2}), of which 3.03 square miles (7.85 km^{2}) (or 99.08%) is land and 0.028 square miles (0.07 km^{2}) (or 0.92%) is water.

== Demographics ==
Historical population
Census	Pop.	Note	%±
1850	84		—
1870	2,186		—
1880	3,441		57.4%
1890	5,905		71.6%
1900	7,786		31.9%
1910	9,340		20.0%
1920	9,293		−0.5%
1930	8,744		−5.9%
1940	8,126		−7.1%
1950	8,434		3.8%
1960	8,853		5.0%
1970	8,163		−7.8%
1980	7,852		−3.8%
1990	7,640		−2.7%
2000	8,188		7.2%
2010	7,912		−3.4%
2020	8,181		3.4%
U.S. Decennial Census

=== 2020 census ===
As of the 2020 census, Brazil had a population of 8,181. The median age was 36.9 years. 24.3% of residents were under the age of 18 and 16.2% of residents were 65 years of age or older. For every 100 females there were 95.8 males, and for every 100 females age 18 and over there were 91.5 males age 18 and over.

98.1% of residents lived in urban areas, while 1.9% lived in rural areas.

There were 3,334 households in Brazil, of which 30.8% had children under the age of 18 living in them. Of all households, 37.3% were married-couple households, 20.3% were households with a male householder and no spouse or partner present, and 33.5% were households with a female householder and no spouse or partner present. About 32.0% of all households were made up of individuals and 13.8% had someone living alone who was 65 years of age or older.

There were 3,664 housing units, of which 9.0% were vacant. The homeowner vacancy rate was 1.8% and the rental vacancy rate was 7.4%.

Racial composition as of the 2020 census
Race	Number	Percent
White	7,528	92.0%
Black or African American	87	1.1%
American Indian and Alaska Native	21	0.3%
Asian	53	0.6%
Native Hawaiian and Other Pacific Islander	6	0.1%
Some other race	94	1.1%
Two or more races	392	4.8%
Hispanic or Latino (of any race)	209	2.6%

=== 2010 census ===
As of the 2010 census, there were 7,912 people, 3,154 households, and 2,018 families living in the city. The population density was 2,611.2 inhabitants per square mile (1,008.2/km^{2}). There were 3,583 housing units at an average density of 1,182.5 per square mile (456.6/km^{2}). The racial makeup of the city was 97.1% White, 0.6% African American, 0.1% Native American, 0.5% Asian, 0.6% from other races, and 1.0% from two or more races. Hispanic or Latino of any race were 1.6% of the population.

There were 3,154 households, of which 35.1% included children under the age of 18, 41.7% were married couples living together, 16.7% had a female householder with no husband present, 5.5% had a male householder with no wife present, and 36.0% were non-families. 30.1% of all households were composed of individuals, and 12.5% had someone living alone who was 65 years of age or older. The average household size was 2.46 and the average family size was 3.04.

The median age in the city was 36.2 years. 26% of residents were under the age of 18; 9.4% were between the ages of 18 and 24; 26.2% were 25 to 44; 23.9% were 45 to 64; and 14.4% were 65 years of age or older. The gender makeup of the city was 48.0% male and 52.0% female.

=== 2000 census ===
As of the 2000 census, there were 8,188 people, 3,383 households, and 2,151 families living in the city. The population density was 2,450.6 inhabitants per square mile (946.2/km^{2}). There were 3,740 housing units at an average density of 1,119.3 per square mile (432.2/km^{2}). The racial makeup of the city was 97.80% White, 0.64% African American, 0.37% Native American, 0.17% Asian, 0.02% Pacific Islander, 0.28% from other races, and 0.72% from two or more races. Hispanic or Latino of any race were 0.61% of the population.

There were 3,383 households, of which 30.2% had children under the age of 18 living with them, 46.7% were married couples living together, 13.1% had a female householder with no husband present, and 36.4% were non-families. 32.2% of all households were composed of individuals, and 17.3% had someone living alone who was 65 years of age or older. The average household size was 2.38 and the average family size was 3.01.

The age demographics were as follows: 25.8% of people were under the age of 18, 9.5% were from 18 to 24, 26.8% were from 25 to 44, 20.6% were from 45 to 64, and 17.3% were 65 years of age or older. The median age was 36 years. For every 100 females, there were 89.7 males. For every 100 females age 18 and over, there were 86.1 males.

The median income for a household in the city was $30,902, and the median income for a family was $37,569. Males had a median income of $29,693 versus $20,215 for females. The per capita income for the city was $15,123. About 10.7% of families and 13.2% of the population were below the poverty line, including 18.5% of those under age 18 and 12.8% of those age 65 or over.

== Government ==
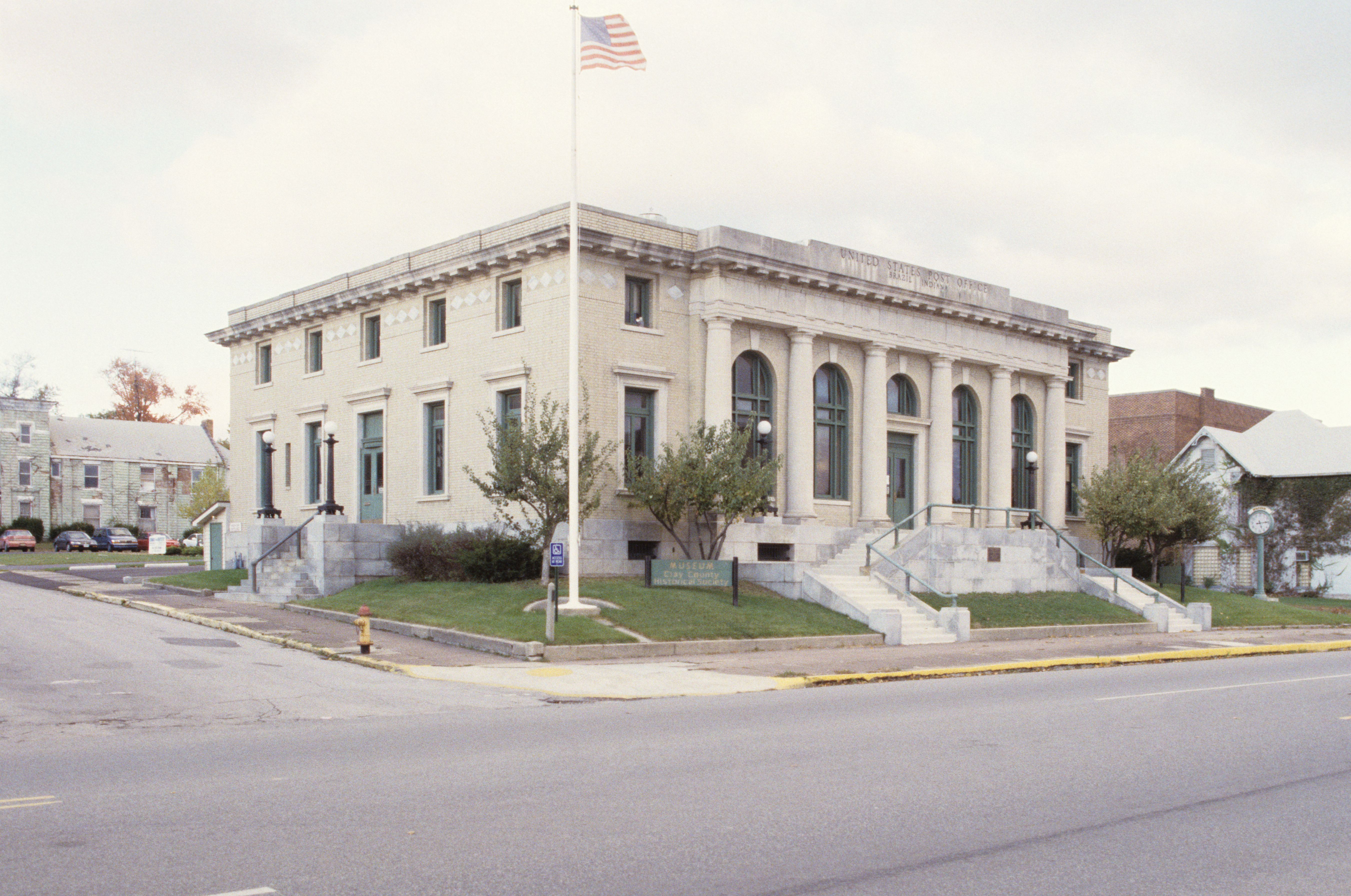
Brazil post office

The government consists of a mayor and a city council. The mayor is elected in a citywide vote. The city council consists of five members. Four are elected from individual districts while one is elected at large. The current chief executive of Brazil is Mayor Brian Wyndham (D).

== Education ==
The city has a free lending library, the Brazil Public Library.

== Transportation ==
=== Airport ===
The Brazil Clay County Airport is a public-use airport located in Clay County, 3 nautical miles (5.6 km; 3.5 mi) south of Brazil's central business district.

== Notable people ==
- Gerald Eades Bentley, scholar of Elizabethan theater
- Gene Cramer, NBL player
- George N. Craig, governor of Indiana, Past National Commander of American Legion
- Johnnie Davis, musician, band leader
- Joe Dean, American basketball player, announcer and college athletic director
- John Dugan, actor
- Ivan Fuqua, winner of gold medal in 4 × 400 m relay at the 1932 Summer Olympics
- David Goggins, US Navy Seal, Motivational Speaker, Ultramarathon runner, New York Times bestselling author
- Charles B. Hall, iconic combat fighter pilot and U.S. Army Air Corps Officer with the Tuskegee Airmen
- Jimmy Hoffa, labor union leader
- Judy Ledgerwood, Abstract painter and educator
- Gayle Porter Hoskins, illustrator
- Stuart Randall, actor who played Sheriff Mort Corey on Laramie
- Orville Redenbacher, popcorn tycoon
- Ralph Francis Stearley, 2-star Air Force general in Gen. Eisenhower's Cabinet
- Henry Lee Summer, 1980s pop singer
- James M. Schlatter, discoverer of aspartame

== Climate ==
Climate is characterized by relatively high temperatures and evenly distributed precipitation throughout the year. The Köppen Climate Classification subtype for this climate is "CFA" (humid subtropical climate).

== See also ==
- Parke County Covered Bridge Festival (15 miles north of Brazil)
- Brazil (Country in South America)
