= Eel River (White River tributary) =

River in Indiana, United States

Coordinates: 39.11782°N 86.96195°W

The Eel River is a 52.8-mile-long (85.0 km) tributary of the White River in southwestern Indiana. Via the White, Wabash, and Ohio rivers, its waters flow to the Mississippi River and the Gulf of Mexico. The Eel River flows through Greene, Owen, Clay, and Putnam counties. It is the southern of the two rivers named Eel River within Indiana.

The river forms in southwestern Putnam County at the confluence of Mill Creek and Big Walnut Creek. It runs generally south and slightly west for most of its course until it takes a southeast turn about 4 miles (6.4 km) west of Martz. It then flows about 18 miles (29 km) to its junction with the White River near Worthington. One of its tributaries, Big Walnut Creek, has a drainage basin of 318 square miles (820 km^{2}). Another tributary is Mill Creek, which flows into Cagles Mill Lake, also known as Cataract Lake, before joining the Eel.

The Eel River has a mean annual discharge of 943 cubic feet per second at Bowling Green, Indiana.

== See also ==
- List of rivers of Indiana
