= Brazil Township, Clay County, Indiana =

Brazil Township
- Township
- Location of Brazil Township in Clay County
- Coordinates: 39°32′08″N 87°07′22″W
- Country: United States
- State: Indiana
- County: Clay

Government
  - Type: Indiana township

Area
  - Total: 6.52 sq mi (16.9 km^{2})
  - Land: 6.46 sq mi (16.7 km^{2})
  - Water: 0.05 sq mi (0.13 km^{2})
- Elevation: 686 ft (209 m)

Population (2020)
  - Total: 8,604
  - Density: 1,330/sq mi (514/km^{2})
- ZIP code: 47834
- Area codes: 812 and 930
- FIPS code: 18-07192
- GNIS feature ID: 453135

Brazil Township is one of eleven townships in Clay County, Indiana. As of the 2010 census, its population was 8,604 (up from 8,471 at 2010) and it contained 3,813 housing units.

== History ==
Brazil Township was organized in 1868.

== Geography ==
According to the 2010 census, the township has a total area of 6.52 square miles (16.9 km^{2}), of which 6.46 square miles (16.7 km^{2}) (or 99.08%) is land and 0.05 square miles (0.13 km^{2}) (or 0.77%) is water.

=== Cities and towns ===
- Brazil (the county seat) (north three-quarters)

=== Unincorporated towns ===
- Donaldsonville

(This list is based on USGS data and may include former settlements.)

=== Adjacent townships ===
- Van Buren Township (northeast)
- Jackson Township (southeast)
- Posey Township (southwest)
- Dick Johnson Township (northwest)

=== Major highways ===
- U.S. Route 40
- State Road 59
- State Road 340

=== Cemeteries ===
The township contains 4 cemeteries: Old Hill, Stunkard, Otter Creek and Restlawn.
