= Cottage Hill =

Cottage Hill or Cottage Hills may refer to:

- Cottage Hill, Indiana, an unincorporated community
- Cottage Hills, Illinois, an unincorporated community
- Cottage Hill, Ohio, an unincorporated community
