= Van Buren Township, Clay County, Indiana =

Van Buren Township
- Township
- Location of Van Buren Township in Clay County
- Coordinates: 39°33′46″N 87°03′38″W
- Country: United States
- State: Indiana
- County: Clay

Government
  - Type: Indiana township

Area
  - Total: 32.32 sq mi (83.7 km^{2})
  - Land: 32.18 sq mi (83.3 km^{2})
  - Water: 0.14 sq mi (0.36 km^{2})
- Elevation: 682 ft (208 m)

Population (2020)
  - Total: 3,203
  - Density: 99.53/sq mi (38.43/km^{2})
- FIPS code: 18-78416
- GNIS feature ID: 453943

Van Buren Township is one of eleven townships in Clay County, Indiana. As of the 2020 census, its population was 3,203 (down from 3,528 at 2010) and it contained 1,415 housing units.

== History ==
Van Buren Township was established in the late 1830s. It was named for Martin Van Buren, the ninth Vice President of the United States. There is also a Dick Johnson Township in Clay County in honor of Richard Mentor Johnson, Van Buren's vice president.

Eaglefield Place was listed on the National Register of Historic Places in 1998.

== Geography ==
According to the 2010 census, the township has a total area of 32.32 square miles (83.7 km^{2}), of which 32.18 square miles (83.3 km^{2}) (or 99.57%) is land and 0.14 square miles (0.36 km^{2}) (or 0.43%) is water.

=== Cities and towns ===
- Carbon
- Harmony
- Knightsville

=== Unincorporated towns ===
- Benwood
- Calcutta
- Cardonia
- Lena
- Mechanicsburg
- Pontiac

(This list is based on USGS data and may include former settlements.)

=== Adjacent townships ===
- Jackson Township, Parke County (north)
- Madison Township, Putnam County (northeast)
- Washington Township, Putnam County (east)
- Jackson Township (south)
- Brazil Township (southwest)
- Dick Johnson Township (west)
- Raccoon Township, Parke County (northwest)

=== Major highways ===
- U.S. Route 40
- State Road 59

=== Cemeteries ===
The township contains five cemeteries: Calcutta, Pell, Pell, Poff and Roberts.
