= Prairie City =

Prairie City may refer to some places in the United States:

- Prairie City, California, south of Folsom
- Prairie City, Illinois
- Prairie City, Indiana
- Prairie City, Iowa
- Prairie City, Kansas, a ghost town in Douglas County, Kansas
- Prairie City, Missouri
- Prairie City, Oregon
- Prairie City, South Dakota
