= Cherryvale =

Cherryvale can refer to several places in the United States:

- Cherryvale, Indiana
- Cherryvale, Kansas
- Cherryvale, South Carolina
