= Alfred Barker =

Alfred Barker may refer to:

- Alfred Barker (doctor) (1819–1873), New Zealand doctor
- Alfred Barker (football manager) (1873–1940), English football manager
- Al Barker (1839–1912), American baseball player
