= Billtown =

Billtown may refer to:

== Places ==
=== Americas ===
==== United States ====
- Billtown, Indiana

==== Canada ====
- Billtown, Nova Scotia
