= Howesville =

Howesville may refer to:

- Howesville, Indiana
- Howesville, West Virginia

== See also ==
- Hawesville, Kentucky
