= Eaglefield =

Eaglefield may refer to:

- Eaglefield, Queensland, a locality in the Isaac Region, Australia
- Eaglefield Place also known as Eaglesfield-Hunt Farm and Western Eyrie Farm, a historic home and farm bridge located in Van Buren Township, Clay County, Indiana, USA
