= Posey Township, Clay County, Indiana =

Posey Township
- Township
- Location of Posey Township in Clay County
- Coordinates: 39°28′27″N 87°11′02″W
- Country: United States
- State: Indiana
- County: Clay

Government
  - Type: Indiana township

Area
  - Total: 35.75 sq mi (92.6 km^{2})
  - Land: 35.04 sq mi (90.8 km^{2})
  - Water: 0.71 sq mi (1.8 km^{2})
- Elevation: 679 ft (207 m)

Population (2020)
  - Total: 4,016
  - Density: 114.6/sq mi (44.25/km^{2})
- FIPS code: 18-61290
- GNIS feature ID: 453761

Posey Township is one of eleven townships in Clay County, Indiana. As of the 2020 census, its population was 4,016 (down from 4,063 at 2010) and it contained 1,682 housing units.

== History ==
Posey Township was organized in 1828. It was named for Territorial Governor Thomas Posey.

== Geography ==
According to the 2010 census, the township has a total area of 35.75 square miles (92.6 km^{2}), of which 35.04 square miles (90.8 km^{2}) (or 98.01%) is land and 0.71 square miles (1.8 km^{2}) (or 1.99%) is water.

=== Cities and towns ===
- Brazil (southwest edge)
- Staunton

=== Unincorporated towns ===
- Billtown
- Billville
- Cherryvale
- Cloverland
- Cottage Hill
- Purdy Hill
- Turner
- Twin Beach

(This list is based on USGS data and may include former settlements.)

=== Adjacent townships ===
- Dick Johnson Township (north)
- Brazil Township (northeast)
- Jackson Township (east)
- Sugar Ridge Township (southeast)
- Perry Township (south)
- Riley Township, Vigo County (southwest)
- Lost Creek Township, Vigo County (west)
- Nevins Township, Vigo County (northwest)

=== Major highways ===
- Interstate 70
- U.S. Route 40
- State Road 42
- State Road 59
- State Road 340

=== Cemeteries ===
The township contains seven cemeteries: Billtown, Clearview, Cottage Hill, German, Rhule, Summit Lawn and Summit Lawn.
