= Mechanicsburg, Indiana =

Mechanicsburg is the name of four unincorporated communities in the state of Indiana:

- Mechanicsburg, Boone County, Indiana
- Mechanicsburg, Clay County, Indiana
- Mechanicsburg, Henry County, Indiana
- Mechanicsburg, Decatur County, Indiana
