= Brunswick, Clay County, Indiana =

Brunswick
- Unincorporated community
- Location in Clay County
- Coordinates: 39°11′49″N 87°07′12″W
- Country: United States
- State: Indiana
- County: Clay
- Township: Lewis
- Elevation: 525 ft (160 m)
- GNIS feature ID: 431671

Brunswick is an unincorporated community in Lewis Township, Clay County, Indiana. It is part of the Terre Haute Metropolitan Statistical Area.

== History ==
Brunswick was founded in about 1831. It was probably named by a settler after his native city of New Brunswick, New Jersey.

== Geography ==
Brunswick is located at 39°11′49″N 87°07′12″W.
