= Benwood =

Benwood may refer to

== Places ==
- Benwood, Indiana
- Benwood, West Virginia

== Ships ==
- Benwood (shipwreck), a Norwegian cargo ship sunk during World War II.
- MV Benwood, a British coaster in service 1947-51
