= Tabertown, Indiana =

- Unincorporated community
- Vigo County's location in Indiana

- location in Vigo County, Indiana
- Coordinates: 39°29′41″N 87°15′11″W
- Country: United States
- State: Indiana
- County: Vigo
- Township: Lost Creek
- Elevation: 590 ft (180 m)
- Time zone: UTC-5 (Eastern (EST))
  - Summer (DST): UTC-4 (EDT)
- ZIP code: 47878
- Area codes: 812, 930
- GNIS feature ID: 444535

Tabertown is an unincorporated community in Lost Creek Township, Vigo County, in the U.S. state of Indiana.

Now within the boundaries of the town of Seelyville, it is also part of the Terre Haute metropolitan area.

== Geography ==
Tabertown is located at 39°29′41″N 87°15′11″W at an elevation of 591 feet.
