= Cottage Hill, Indiana =

Location of early settlement

Cottage Hill
- Unincorporated community
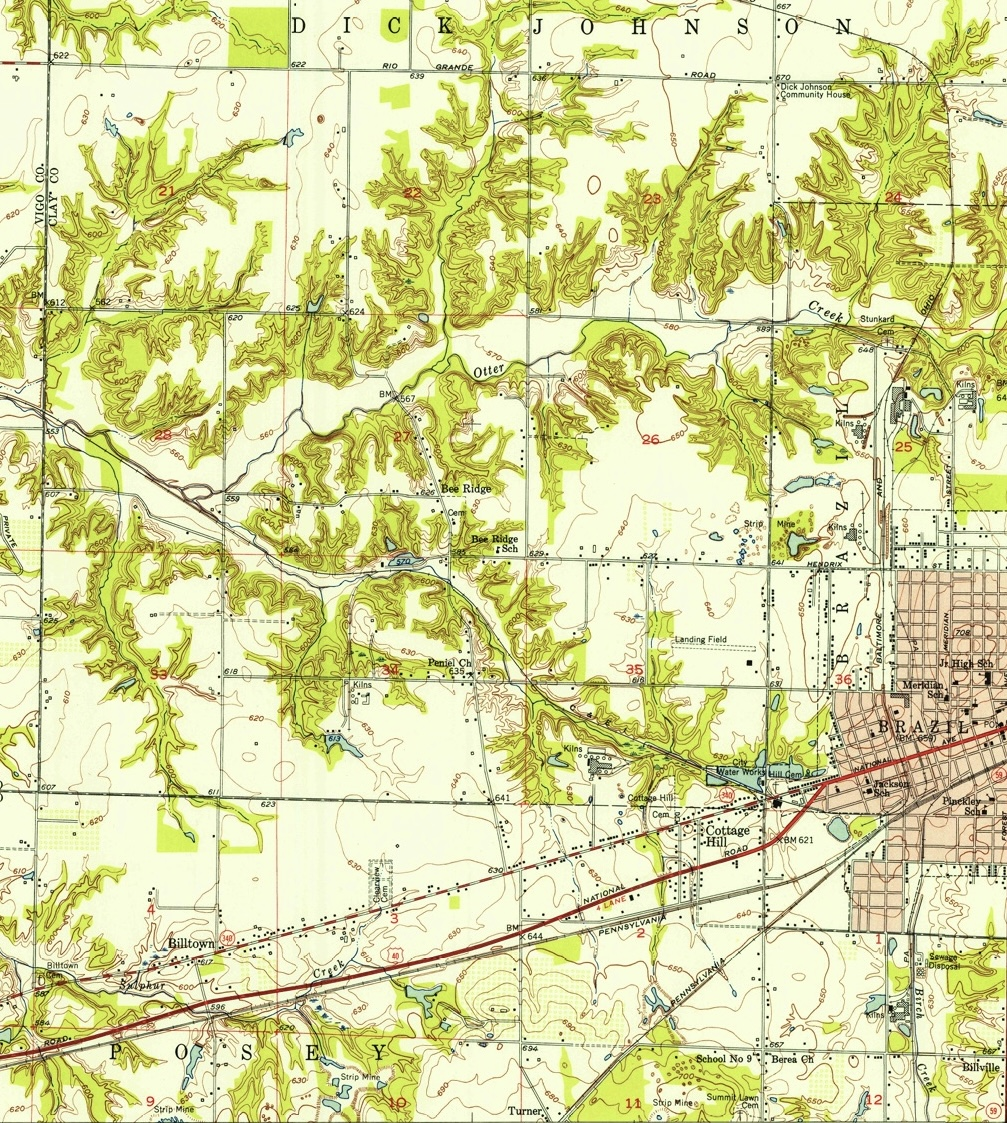
- 1950 USGS map showing Cottage Hill along Indiana State Road 340

- Location in Clay County
- Coordinates: 39°31′01″N 87°08′57″W
- Country: United States
- State: Indiana
- County: Clay
- Township: Posey
- Elevation: 640 ft (200 m)
- GNIS feature ID: 433013

Cottage Hill is a location in Posey Township, Clay County, Indiana. It is part of the Terre Haute Metropolitan Statistical Area. The settlement was home to the Van Buren, Indiana post office for a brief period in the 1830s. The site hosted Cunningham's Tavern in the first half of the 19th century, when the National Road carried much of the traffic between Terre Haute and Indianapolis. The tavern was reportedly a stopping point for the likes of Henry Clay, Martin Van Buren, and Abraham Lincoln. The location also hosted a training racetrack for horses. The Cottage Hill Cemetery, opened 1876, was a stop on the Brazil, Indiana street railway in the 1890s, and some successor lines.

== History ==
=== Establishment ===
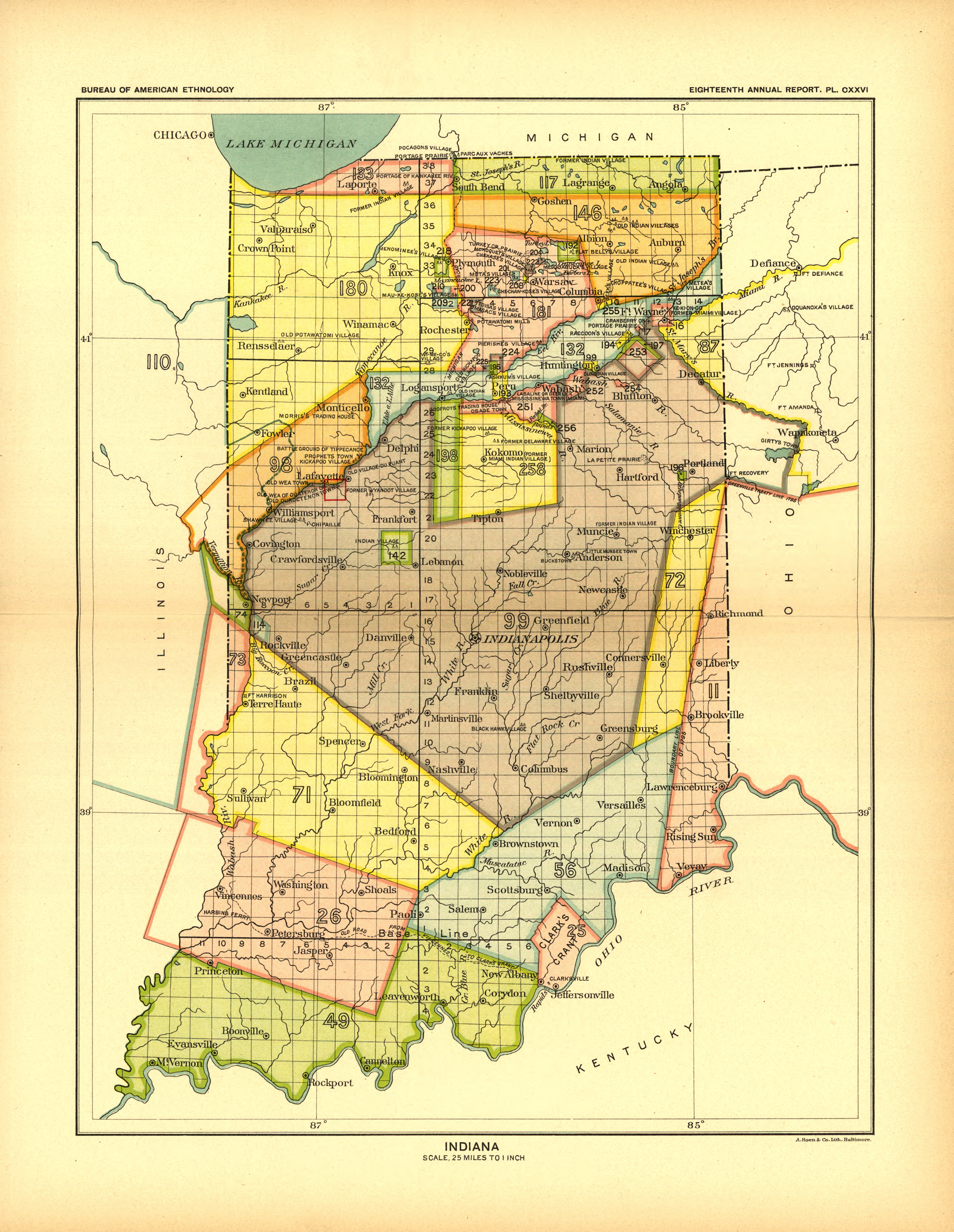
Cottage Hill belonged to indigenous people before the 1809 Treaty of Fort Wayne

The National Road was surveyed through Indiana in 1827, but "the country lying between Terre Haute and Indianapolis was an almost unbroken wilderness, the settlements were separated by extensive and gloomy forests, and only a few villages were scattered along the line of the National Road." There was very little money and almost no agriculture in Posey Township at that time, which was still wild country populated by wolves, and "For a number of years, Terre Haute was the nearest market place, where the settlers disposed of venison hams, deer skins, coon skins, wild honey, and ginseng, the only articles of commercial importance the country afforded at that time. Some of the early farmers raised a great many hogs, to fatten which required no outlay of money and but little trouble, the woods during the fall of the year affording vast quantities of 'mast' upon which the animals fed."

According to settler Martin Bowles, writing in 1879, "The first post office on the National Road in Clay county was located a mile west of Brazil, opposite the Stough place, named Van Buren and kept by Philip Hedges, who had decided to lay out a town there, but from some cause abandoned it. I think this office was located there as early as 1832 or 1833. Some years afterward it was removed to Williamstown and discontinued about 1860." (Note: Hedges also built Clay County's first courthouse, out of logs, back in 1829, four years after the county was organized in 1825.) (Note: Williamtown was located about four miles west of Brazil.) The post office, opened in 1833, was also a tavern and a place of worship.

=== Tavern tales ===
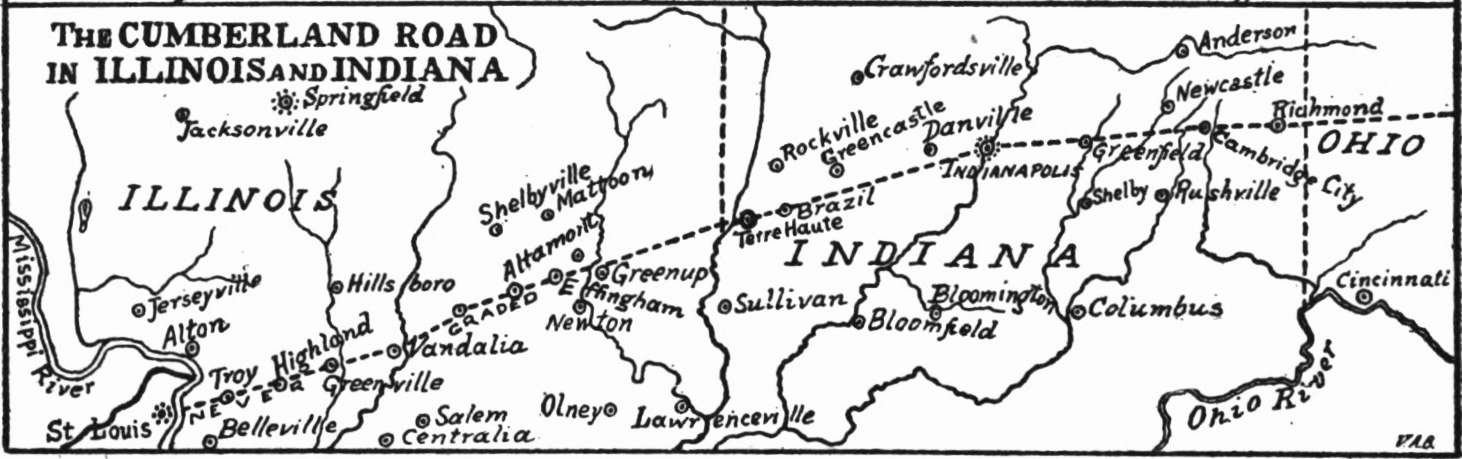
Cumberland Road (National Road) through Illinois and Indiana, mapped 1904

The log-hewn building at what is now Cottage Hill was first known as Hedge's Tavern, and was ultimately one of nine such roadside taverns in Clay County. Most of the taverns along the road in Clay County were about two or three miles apart from each other. These taverns served the stages that carried passengers, but also transported freight and, perhaps most importantly, the mail. According to one history of the National Road, "At almost every mile of the road's long length, wagonhouses offered hospitality to the hundreds engaged in the great freight traffic. Here a large room with its fireplace could be found before which to lay blankets on a winter's night. The most successful wagonhouses were situated at the outskirts of the larger towns, where, at more reasonable prices and in more congenial surroundings than in a crowded city inn, the rough sturdy men upon whom the whole West depended for over a generation for its merchandise, found hospitable entertainment for themselves and their rugged horses. These houses were usually unpretentious frame buildings surrounded by a commodious yard, and generous watering-troughs and barns. A hundred tired horses have been heard munching their corn in a single wagon house yard at the end of a long day's work." Hedge's Tavern was later known as Cunningham Tavern and was recalled to the Brazil Times in 1927: "The Cunningham Tavern and stage station is remembered by John Robison as a large, long building standing where his residence is now situated. Taverns had a few large rooms for accommodating passengers. Sometimes several beds would occupy one large room. Hospitality reigned supreme. Passengers would be taken in as long as the capacity of the house was not filled up."

The county history published in 1909 describes the spot in some detail:

On the hill, a mile west of the town, on the north side of the National Road, was the Usher homestead, better known for more than fifty years past as the Stough place. This house was built in 1838, by John Scott, of Terre Haute, on which Harvey D. Scott (later a member of Congress) and William Y. Stewart did the carpenter work. It was thought at that time to be the best dwelling-house in all that part of the country...Immediately across the road from the Usher place was Cunningham's, a hewn-log tavern bought from Benjamin Hedges, which Cunningham enlarged and improved, who continued to conduct the tavern and also maintained a race-track on the premises, where Terre Haute sportsmen trained their horses. The original house here was built before the Usher house. When Cunningham died his widow continued to conduct the place until the marriage of her last daughter, in 1848 or 1849, when she sold the property to Nelson Markle, who later sold to Charles Whippo, then Whippo to John Smith, and he to John Robinson.

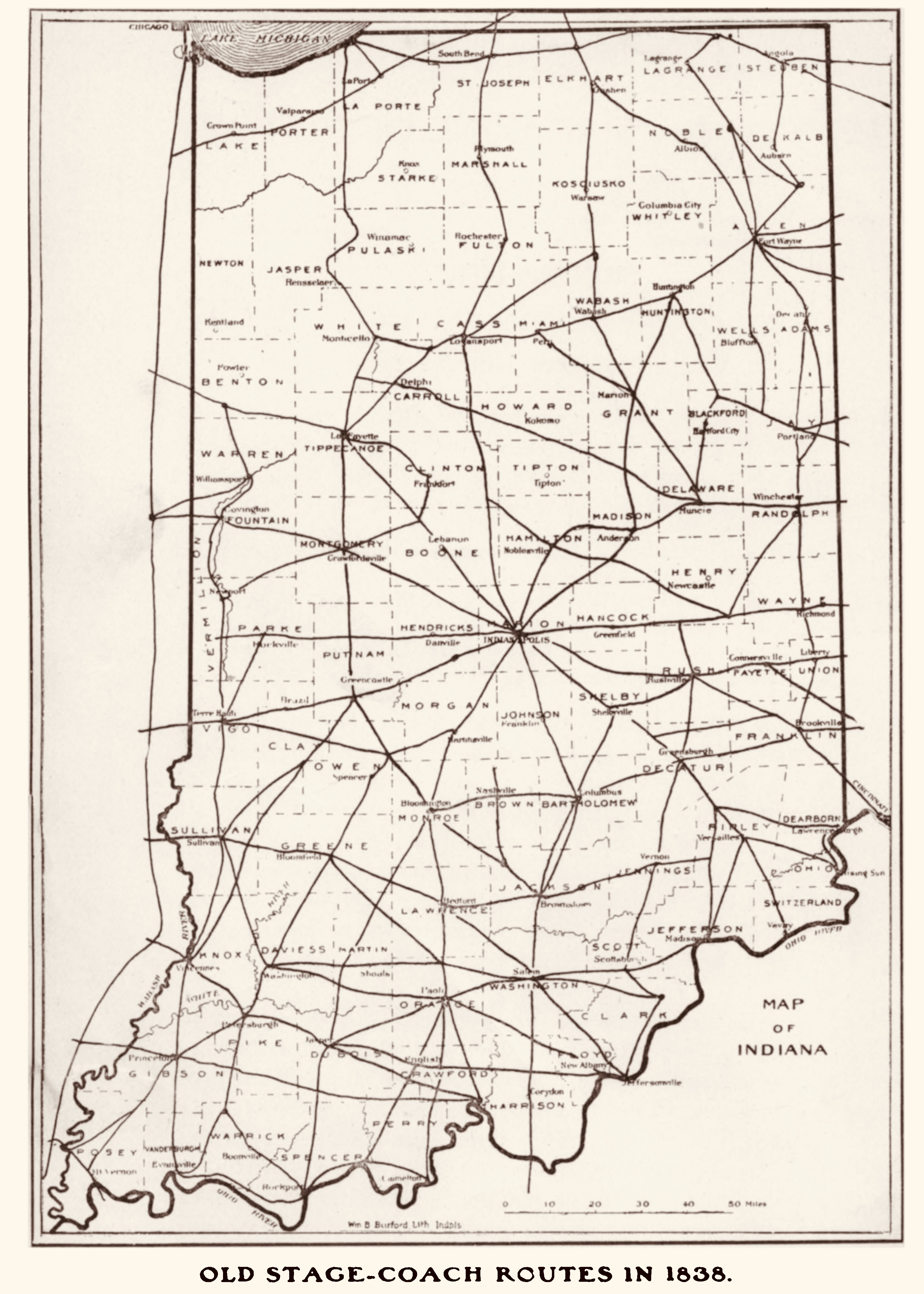
Stage coach and wagon routes through Indiana in 1838

The Usher homestead belonged to Dr. Nathaniel Usher, whose son was Secretary of the Interior John P. Usher. A writer of 1920, who created a "clever bit of historical fiction masquerading as a genuine diary," included the location on an imagined journey between Putnamville and Terre Haute in 1840: "This last stretch of road toward the state's western boundary was under construction during last year and the year before, and is in fairly good condition. There are some excellent bridges with stone abutments across small streams, and a notably long one, the yellow bridge, just before one arrives in Terre Haute. There are many inns along the way, in Clay County, Kennedy's, and, in a delightful situation, upon a hill, Cunningham Tavern, which last named is fixed in my memory because it stands just opposite a most beautiful homestead erected by a Mr. Usher just two years ago, I was informed, and which is considered the finest dwelling house in this part of the state." Nearby Brazil was a hamlet of 16 people in 1845. According to an early settler named Eli Hendrix, Martin Van Buren once had breakfast at the tavern: "...he chose a bad time of year to do his exploring. As the caravan reached the old Corduroy, at Lover's Lane, the stage got all in the ruts, turned over, and out goes the fine gentleman, right down in all the mud and slush. He was considerably injured and shakened up, as well as half scared to death. The driver's name was Muson Wright, and we all knew him very well. They were all a mess of mud when they got to Brazil. The Driver and some others ate breakfast at our house, then Mr. Van Buren was taken to the Tavern, kept by the Widow, Mrs. Cunningham, situated on the hill west of town, where the home of Mr. John Robinson, now stands. He ate his breakfast at her tavern. In the meantime our shop men fixed up the stage, and we got the horses and harness all in trim and ready to proceed on West."

Old timers later recalled, "The celebrated hostelry must have furnished good places for travelers to stop. It was noted for many miles in different directions for the splendid service given its customers. Travelers would shorten or lengthen their trip in order to reach the place for 'putting up.' Older inhabitants in past times recall the guests at Cunningham's included such persons as Martin Van Buren, Henry Clay, and possibly Abraham Lincoln. The opening of the railroad stopped stage line patronage and reduced travel over the National Road...The celebrated old building was destroyed by fire, possibly in 1855 or 1856. Even after stagecoach traffic along the National Road diminished, the location remained useful: "Much travel took place after the railroad construction by means of the covered wagon. The wide road made good camping ground."

=== The Great Comet of 1858 ===
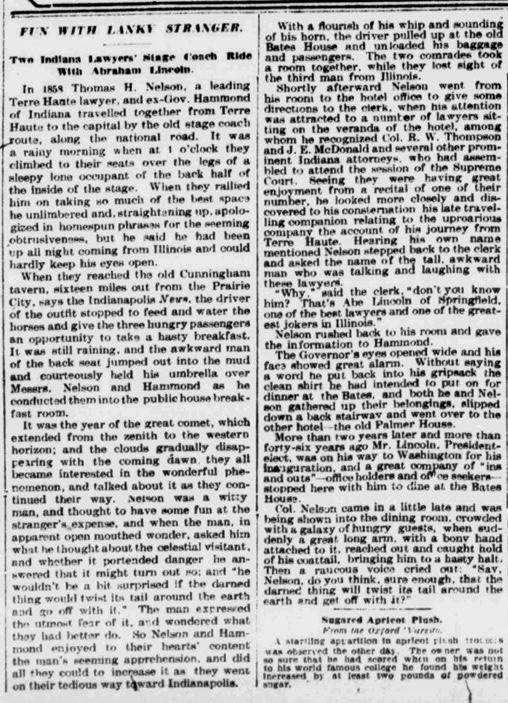
"Fun with Lanky Stranger" New York Sun March 3, 1907

Attorney Thomas H. Nelson claimed to have gazed up at Comet Donati outside Cunningham's Tavern one misty dawn in 1858, in company with future Indiana governor Abram A. Hammond and a lanky stranger (who took up much too much space in the cramped stagecoach). The stranger said, with a straight face, that "he wouldn't be a bit surprised if the darned thing would twist its tail around the earth and go off with it." The stranger was, of course, Abraham Lincoln, who later ran into Nelson at a gathering, yanked on the tail of Nelson's coat and quipped, "Say, Nelson, do you think, sure enough, that the darned thing will twist its tail around the earth and get off with it?"

=== Cemetery and interurban ===
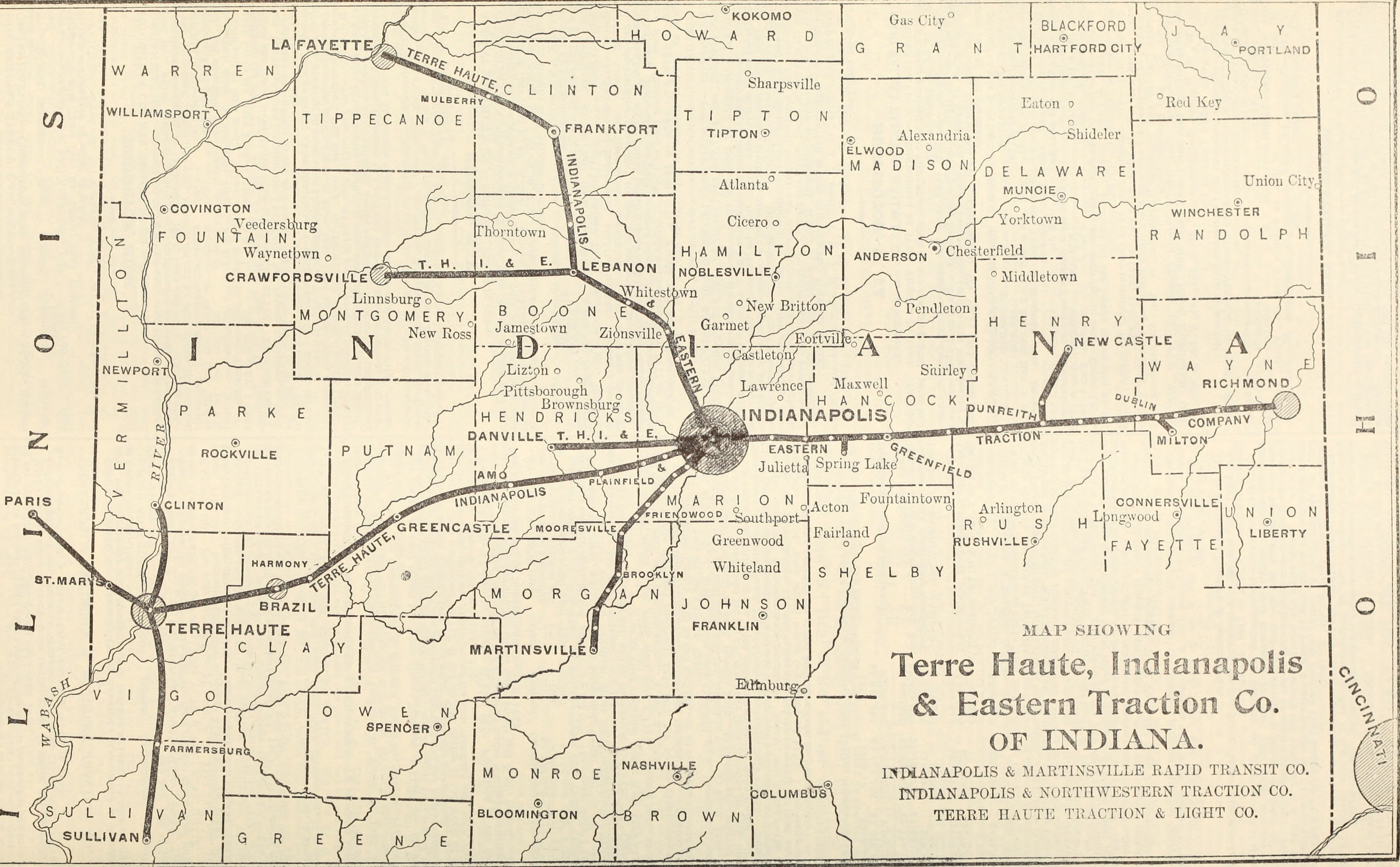
Map of Terre Haute, Indianapolis and Eastern Traction Company tracks c. 1911

Joseph Stough bought Usher's farm in 1856, and "improved it, having a nice residence, a commodious barn, and plenty of stock." Cottage Hill Cemetery, also known as Stough's Cemetery or Stough's Cottage Hill Cemetery, was initially established on 11 acres of land owned by Joseph Stough. The cemetery first opened for burials in 1876. The Cottage Hill Cemetery is located at 39.51860°N 87.15170°W. In 1893, the Brazil Rapid Transit Company opened a 4.5 mi (7.2 km) interurban streetcar line from Cottage Hill to Harmony, Indiana. Brazil Transit had initially extended their line out to Cottage Hill Cemetery on the western edge of town because one of the board members was "deeply interested in making Cottage Hill Cemetery an ideal burial ground". According to local historians, there are few records of this line but "it was in existence several years before the line built from Terre Haute reached Cottage Hill and reconstructed the old line for the use of the new system. This was the first interurban line out of Terre Haute and must have been completed by 1900." The Indiana interurban network was quite extensive in the early 20th century and "Almost any community of any size on this widespread system was a station, though it seldom had a ticket office and all freight was prepaid. The numerous unnamed stops, which in many cases were only road crossings, were actually 'whistle stops,' where one half mile away the motorman sounded his air chime, the successor of the steam whistle, and people desiring to board the car stood at the side of the track and waved their hand in the daytime or burned a newspaper torch at night to attract his attention. To many hundreds of the elite patrons of the road, these 'whistle stops' were a joke and merely something to liven conversation at parties, but to thousands they meant home."

=== Schoolhouse ===
There was a Cottage Hill School established before 1907, and disestablished after 1925.

== Geography ==
Cottage Hill is located at 39°31′01″N 87°08′57″W along Indiana State Road 340, a two-lane road that was later bypassed by U.S. Route 40 § Indiana. Cottage Hill is 6.7 mi (10.8 km) due south of Spook Light Hill, a haunted place according to Indiana folklore.

== Sources ==
- n.a. (May 17, 1927). "Little Sketches of Clay County Historical Events". The Brazil Daily Times. Vol. XXXVIII, no. 140. Brazil, Indiana: Henkel Publishing Co. p. 3.
- Blanchard, Charles, ed. (1884). Counties of Clay and Owen, Indiana, Historical and Biographical, Illustrated. "Posey Township" by G. N. Berry, "Brazil City and Township" by A. F. Bridges. Chicago: F. A. Battey & Co. LCCN 05021836. OCLC 681079381. OL 6957566M.
- Burns, Lee (1919). "The National Road in Indiana". Indiana Historical Society Publications. 7 (4). C. E. Pauley & Company. ISBN 978-1-5487-8748-6.
- Cottman, Geo. S. (December 1907). "Internal Improvements in Indiana". The Indiana Quarterly Magazine of History. 3 (4): 149–181. ISSN 0147-2259. JSTOR 27785130.
- Fisher, Vicky (September 10, 1972). "The Interurbans: When the Trains Stopped" (PDF). Star Magazine. The Indianapolis Star (Vol. 70, No. 97), Sunday magazine insert, microfilmed with Saturday edition, original pagination non-sequential (editorial error?). Indianapolis, Indiana – via Bell Memorial Public Library (docs.bell.lib.in.us), Mentone, Indiana.
- Hubbard, Nelle Decker (1936). Pinhook to Brazil. Greenfield, Indiana: Wm. Mitchell Printing Co. hdl:2027/wu.89062877618. LCCN 36009681. OCLC 1157051392. OL 6336238M – via HathiTrust.
- Hulbert, Archer Butler (1904). The Cumberland Road. Historic Highways of America. Vol. 10. Cleveland, Ohio: A. H. Clark Co. hdl:2027/uc1.31210011816178. LCCN 04000825. OCLC 557776365. OL 7212575M – via HathiTrust.
- Lewis, E. I. (March 1907). "Old Stage-Coach Days". The Indiana Quarterly Magazine of History. 3 (1): 21–25. ISSN 0147-2259. JSTOR 27785472.
- Rabb, Kate Milner (1920). A Tour Through Indiana in 1840: The Diary of John Parsons of Petersburg, Virginia. New York: Robert M. McBride & Co. hdl:2027/loc.ark:/13960/t3514bt8s. LCCN 20019355. OCLC 948545537. OL 23349016M – via HathiTrust.
- Shippee, Lester B., ed. (December 1921). "A Tour through Indiana in 1840". Reviews of Books. The Mississippi Valley Historical Review. 8 (3): 283–284. doi:10.2307/1889093. JSTOR 1889093.
- Travis, William (1909). A History of Clay County, Indiana: Closing the first century's history of the county, and showing the growth of its people, institutions, industries and wealth. Vol. I. Chicago: Lewis Publishing Company. hdl:2027/nnc1.cu01514288. LCCN 10023240. OCLC 910486668 – via HathiTrust.
