= Fontanet, Indiana =

- Census-designated place
- Location of Fontanet in Vigo County, Indiana.
- Coordinates: 39°34′34″N 87°14′37″W
- Country: United States
- State: Indiana
- County: Vigo
- Township: Nevins

Area
  - Total: 4.08 sq mi (10.56 km^{2})
  - Land: 4.05 sq mi (10.49 km^{2})
  - Water: 0.027 sq mi (0.07 km^{2})
- Elevation: 597 ft (182 m)

Population (2020)
  - Total: 347
  - Density: 85.7/sq mi (33.08/km^{2})
- Time zone: UTC−5 (Eastern (EST))
  - Summer (DST): UTC−4 (EDT)
- ZIP Code: 47851
- Area codes: 812, 930
- GNIS feature ID: 2583452

Fontanet (also Fountain, Fountain Station, or Hunter) is an unincorporated census-designated place in central Nevins Township, Vigo County, in the U.S. state of Indiana. It lies along Baldwin St., northeast of the city of Terre Haute, the county seat of Vigo County. Although Fontanet is unincorporated, it has a post office, with the ZIP Code of 47851. As of the 2020 census, Fontanet had a population of 347.

Fontanet is part of the Terre Haute Metropolitan Statistical Area.

Each year on the last weekend in August, Fontanet enjoys the Annual Fontanet Bean Dinner Festival, a tradition stemming from a Civil War veterans' picnic first held in 1890. The festival was originally held on land near the DuPont Powder Mill. After the mill exploded in 1907, the picnic moved to the site known as Holloway Grove, donated by local landowner Bill Holloway.

== Demographics ==
Historical population
Census	Pop.	Note	%±
2020	347		—
U.S. Decennial Census

== History ==
Fontanet, two miles west of Coal Bluff, was also an important mining town worked and operated by the Coal Bluff Mining Company. The town also was an important railroad station on the Indianapolis and St. Louis Railroad. The mining company had a large general store, and in 1890 over 300 miners lived in Fontanet.

The town's post office was established under the name Fountain Station in 1870. It was renamed to Hunter in 1877, and again to Fontanet in 1881. The post office is still in operation as of April 2017.

On 15 October 1907, approximately 40,000 kegs of powder exploded at the DuPont Powder Mill of Fontanet, Indiana, killing between 50 and 80 people, and destroying the town. The sound of the explosion was heard over 200 miles (320 km) away, with damage occurring to buildings 25 miles (40 km) away.

== Education ==
All areas in Vigo County are in the Vigo County School Corporation. Fontanet is zoned to Rio Grande Elementary School, Otter Creek Middle School, and Terre Haute North Vigo High School.
