= Dick Johnson Township, Clay County, Indiana =

Dick Johnson Township
- Township
- Location of Dick Johnson Township in Clay County
- Coordinates: 39°33′53″N 87°09′49″W
- Country: United States
- State: Indiana
- County: Clay

Government
  - Type: Indiana township

Area
  - Total: 21.56 sq mi (55.8 km^{2})
  - Land: 21.46 sq mi (55.6 km^{2})
  - Water: 0.1 sq mi (0.26 km^{2})
- Elevation: 646 ft (197 m)

Population (2020)
  - Total: 1,355
  - Density: 63.14/sq mi (24.38/km^{2})
- FIPS code: 18-18118
- GNIS feature ID: 453265

Dick Johnson Township is one of eleven townships in Clay County, Indiana. As of the 2020 census, its population was 1,355 (down from 1,453 at 2010) and it contained 576 housing units.

== History ==
Dick Johnson Township was established in the late 1830s. This township was named for Richard Mentor Johnson, the ninth Vice President of the United States, serving in the administration of Martin Van Buren. There is also a Van Buren Township in Clay County in honor of the 8th President.

== Geography ==
According to the 2010 census, the township has a total area of 21.56 square miles (55.8 km^{2}), of which 21.46 square miles (55.6 km^{2}) (or 99.54%) is land and 0.1 square miles (0.26 km^{2}) (or 0.46%) is water.

=== Cities and towns ===
- Brazil (northwest edge)

=== Unincorporated towns ===
- Perth
- Wickville

(This list is based on USGS data and may include former settlements.)

=== Adjacent townships ===
- Raccoon Township, Parke County (north)
- Jackson Township, Parke County (northeast)
- Van Buren Township (east)
- Brazil Township (southeast)
- Posey Township (south)
- Nevins Township, Vigo County (west)

=== Major highways ===
- Indiana State Road 59
- Indiana State Road 340

=== Cemeteries ===
The township contains seventeen cemeteries: Archer, Carter, Orchard, Perth, Saint Marys, Sampson, Greek Catholic, Cottage Hill, Eldridge, Don & Chris Loughmiller, [Unnamed], Bee Ridge, Rock Run, Kessel, Percals, Odell, & Webster
