= Jackson Township, Clay County, Indiana =

Jackson Township
- Township
- Location of Jackson Township in Clay County
- Coordinates: 39°28′51″N 87°04′24″W
- Country: United States
- State: Indiana
- County: Clay

Government
  - Type: Indiana township

Area
  - Total: 35.68 sq mi (92.4 km^{2})
  - Land: 35.09 sq mi (90.9 km^{2})
  - Water: 0.59 sq mi (1.5 km^{2})
- Elevation: 620 ft (190 m)

Population (2020)
  - Total: 2,839
  - Density: 80.91/sq mi (31.24/km^{2})
- FIPS code: 18-36864
- GNIS feature ID: 453436

Jackson Township is one of eleven townships in Clay County, Indiana. As of the 2020 census, its population was 2,839 (up from 2,739 at 2010) and it contained 1,187 housing units.

== History ==
Jackson Township was established about 1832. It was named for Andrew Jackson, who was then serving as President of the United States.

== Geography ==
According to the 2010 census, the township has a total area of 35.68 square miles (92.4 km^{2}), of which 35.09 square miles (90.9 km^{2}) (or 98.35%) is land and 0.59 square miles (1.5 km^{2}) (or 1.65%) is water.

=== Cities and towns ===
- Brazil (southeast quarter)

=== Unincorporated towns ===
- Asherville
- Hoosierville
- Prairie City
- Stearleyville

(This list is based on USGS data and may include former settlements.)

=== Adjacent townships ===
- Van Buren Township (north)
- Washington Township, Putnam County (northeast)
- Cass Township (east)
- Washington Township (southeast)
- Sugar Ridge Township (south)
- Perry Township (southwest)
- Posey Township (west)
- Brazil Township (northwest)

=== Major highways ===
- Interstate 70
- Indiana State Road 42
- Indiana State Road 59

=== Cemeteries ===
The township contains five cemeteries: Kealber, Neidlinger, Poplar, Wesley Chapel and Zenor.
