= Staunton, Indiana =

- Town
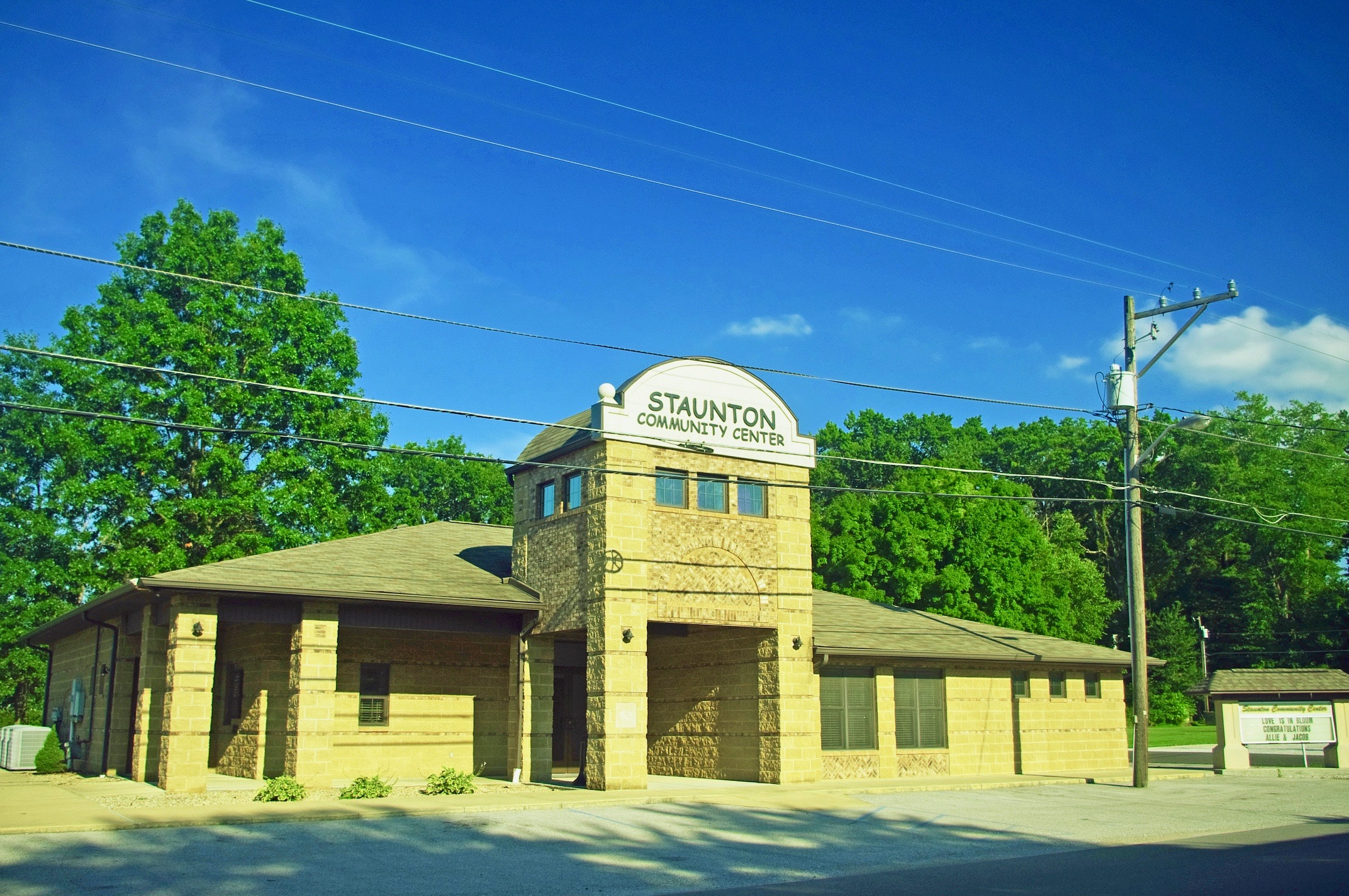
- Staunton Community Center

- Location of Staunton in Clay County, Indiana.
- Coordinates: 39°29′14″N 87°11′18″W
- Country: United States
- State: Indiana
- County: Clay
- Township: Posey

Area
  - Total: 0.33 sq mi (0.85 km^{2})
  - Land: 0.33 sq mi (0.85 km^{2})
  - Water: 0 sq mi (0.00 km^{2})
- Elevation: 646 ft (197 m)

Population (2020)
  - Total: 472
  - Density: 1,444.3/sq mi (557.63/km^{2})
- Time zone: UTC-5 (Eastern (EST))
  - Summer (DST): UTC-4 (EDT)
- ZIP code: 47881
- Area code: 812
- FIPS code: 18-72782
- GNIS feature ID: 0449846

Staunton is a town in Posey Township, Clay County, Indiana, United States. As of the 2020 census, Staunton had a population of 472. It is part of the Terre Haute Metropolitan Statistical Area.

== History ==
Staunton had its start in the year 1851 by the building of the railroad through that territory. The town was named after Staunton, Virginia. During the 1910s all of the elected officials in the town were members of the Socialist Party of America.

== In Pop-Culture ==
The town of Staunton, Indiana is featured as the home of fictional character "Altus Brown" in the children's book "Altus Brown and the Great Sulphur Creek Bike Jump". Author E. Michael Brown grew up in the town in the 70s and 80s and wrote the book as a tribute to the magic of small-town living and all the characters that reside there.

== Geography ==
Staunton is located at 39°29′14″N 87°11′18″W (39.487302, -87.188251).

According to the 2010 census, Staunton has a total area of 0.34 square miles (0.88 km^{2}), all land.

== Demographics ==
Historical population
Census	Pop.	Note	%±
1870	589		—
1880	581		−1.4%
1890	549		−5.5%
1900	693		26.2%
1910	746		7.6%
1920	642		−13.9%
1930	482		−24.9%
1940	387		−19.7%
1950	487		25.8%
1960	490		0.6%
1970	582		18.8%
1980	607		4.3%
1990	592		−2.5%
2000	550		−7.1%
2010	534		−2.9%
2020	472		−11.6%
U.S. Decennial Census

=== 2010 census ===
As of the census of 2010, there were 534 people, 199 households, and 146 families living in the town. The population density was 1,525.7 inhabitants per square mile (589.1/km^{2}). There were 224 housing units at an average density of 640.0 per square mile (247.1/km^{2}). The racial makeup of the town was 98.3% White, 1.5% from other races, and 0.2% from two or more races. Hispanic or Latino of any race were 2.1% of the population.

There were 199 households, of which 40.2% had children under the age of 18 living with them, 59.3% were married couples living together, 10.6% had a female householder with no husband present, 3.5% had a male householder with no wife present, and 26.6% were non-families. 20.1% of all households were made up of individuals, and 7.5% had someone living alone who was 65 years of age or older. The average household size was 2.68 and the average family size was 3.10.

The median age in the town was 36.6 years. 29.2% of residents were under the age of 18; 5.3% were between the ages of 18 and 24; 28.7% were from 25 to 44; 25.1% were from 45 to 64; and 11.8% were 65 years of age or older. The gender makeup of the town was 50.2% male and 49.8% female.

=== 2000 census ===
As of the census of 2000, there were 550 people, 198 households, and 152 families living in the town. The population density was 1,614.0 inhabitants per square mile (623.2/km^{2}). There were 217 housing units at an average density of 636.8 per square mile (245.9/km^{2}). The racial makeup of the town was 98.55% White, 0.55% Asian, and 0.91% from two or more races. Hispanic or Latino of any race were 0.55% of the population.

There were 198 households, out of which 37.9% had children under the age of 18 living with them, 65.7% were married couples living together, 10.1% had a female householder with no husband present, and 23.2% were non-families. 19.7% of all households were made up of individuals, and 11.1% had someone living alone who was 65 years of age or older. The average household size was 2.78 and the average family size was 3.19.

In the town, the population was spread out, with 30.2% under the age of 18, 8.9% from 18 to 24, 28.4% from 25 to 44, 20.5% from 45 to 64, and 12.0% who were 65 years of age or older. The median age was 33 years. For every 100 females, there were 82.7 males. For every 100 females age 18 and over, there were 84.6 males.

The median income for a household in the town was $38,750, and the median income for a family was $43,125. Males had a median income of $31,500 versus $20,893 for females. The per capita income for the town was $14,192. About 3.4% of families and 6.5% of the population were below the poverty line, including 9.4% of those under age 18 and 4.8% of those age 65 or over.
