= Vigo County Home for Dependent Children =

- U.S. National Register of Historic Places
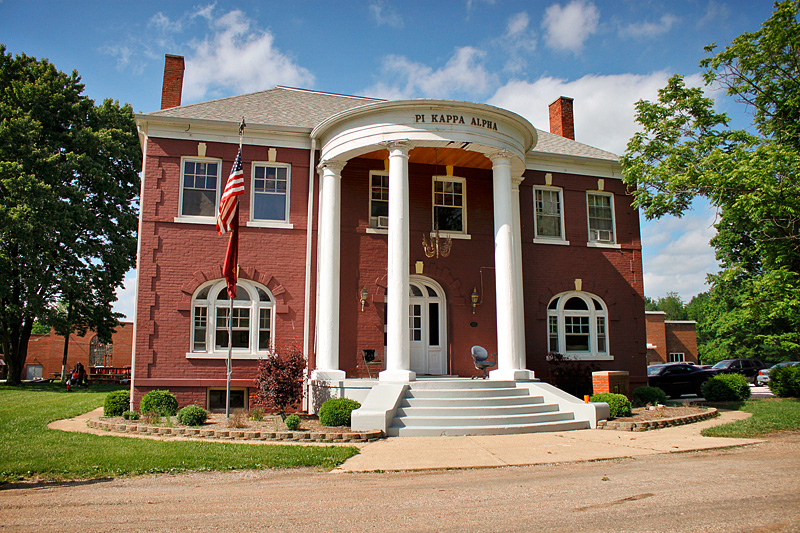
- Vigo County Home for Dependent Children, May 2010

- Location within Vigo County, Indiana Location within Indiana Location within the United States
- Location: 7140 Wabash Ave. east of Terre Haute, Indiana
- Coordinates: 39°29′16″N 87°18′21″W
- Area: less than one acre
- Built: 1903
- Architect: Miller, Martin
- Architectural style: Colonial Revival
- NRHP reference No.: 00000674
- Added to NRHP: June 15, 2000

Vigo County Home for Dependent Children, also known as the Glenn Home, is a historic orphanage located in Lost Creek Township, Vigo County, Indiana. The main building was built in 1903, and is a 2 1/2-story, Colonial Revival style brick building on a raised basement. It has a hipped and gabled roof and features a semi-circular, two-story portico with four Doric order columns. Also on the property is a contributing former boiler house (now demolished). The main building is the home of the Pi Kappa Alpha fraternity chapter at Rose-Hulman Institute of Technology.

It was listed on the National Register of Historic Places in 2000.
