= Stearleyville, Indiana =

Stearleyville
- Unincorporated community
- Location in Clay County
- Coordinates: 39°26′42″N 87°03′41″W
- Country: United States
- State: Indiana
- County: Clay
- Township: Jackson
- Elevation: 650 ft (200 m)
- ZIP code: 47840
- FIPS code: 18-72854
- GNIS feature ID: 444104

Stearleyville is an unincorporated community in Jackson Township, Clay County, Indiana.

The townsite of Stearleyville was founded by George Stearley, the son of German immigrants Johann (John) and Rosanna Burkhardt Stierle from Pfuhl, Neu-Ulm, Bavaria who emigrated to Clay County in 1856. George Steraley served as Clay County sheriff. In this family there were six sons: George, William, John, Fred, Charles and Tobias, and one daughter, Rose. There was a railroad depot, store, church and several dwellings. A blacksmith shop was started by George Stearley II, then operated by his brother Roy. A post office was established at Stearleyville in 1893, and remained in operation until it was discontinued in 1902.

By 1900, there were so many descendants of the Stearleys in the area, it prompted a local saying that "Clay County was made up of Stearleys and Ragweeds".

Today this area is part of the Terre Haute Metropolitan Statistical Area.

== Geography ==
Stearleyville is located at 39°26′42″N 87°03′41″W.
