= Twin Beach, Indiana =

Twin Beach
- Unincorporated community
- Location in Clay County
- Coordinates: 39°31′05″N 87°12′18″W
- Country: United States
- State: Indiana
- County: Clay
- Township: Posey
- Elevation: 614 ft (187 m)
- ZIP code: 47834
- FIPS code: 18-76910
- GNIS feature ID: 445006

Twin Beach is an unincorporated community in Posey Township, Clay County, Indiana. It is part of the Terre Haute Metropolitan Statistical Area.

== History ==
Twin Beach took its name from a former public beach on the lake.

== Geography ==
Twin Beach is located at 39°31′05″N 87°12′18″W.
