= Lewis Township, Clay County, Indiana =

Lewis Township
- Township
- Location of Lewis Township in Clay County
- Coordinates: 39°13′21″N 87°11′23″W
- Country: United States
- State: Indiana
- County: Clay

Government
  - Type: Indiana township

Area
  - Total: 44.22 sq mi (114.5 km^{2})
  - Land: 44.05 sq mi (114.1 km^{2})
  - Water: 0.17 sq mi (0.44 km^{2})
- Elevation: 548 ft (167 m)

Population (2020)
  - Total: 1,373
  - Density: 31.17/sq mi (12.03/km^{2})
- FIPS code: 18-43002
- GNIS feature ID: 453548

Lewis Township is one of eleven townships in Clay County, Indiana. As of the 2020 census, its population was 1,373 (down from 1,464 at 2010) and it contained 613 housing units.

== History ==
Lewis Township was organized in the 1840s. It was named for Lewis Cass.

Elijah Rawley was one of the first settlers in what became Lewis Township, arriving in about 1823, and built a mill on the Eel River near "Old Hill." Thus "Old Hill" or "The Old Hill" is among the oldest settled points on the Eel River. In fact, according to a 1902 article, when the county was organized in 1825, " 'The Old Hill' was the most frequented and noted point within its borders." From 1848 until 1853, a Carrithers Township existed, and the voting place was at Rawley's, at the intersection of current County Roads 525W and 600 South.

== Geography ==
According to the 2010 census, the township has a total area of 44.22 square miles (114.5 km^{2}), of which 44.05 square miles (114.1 km^{2}) (or 99.62%) is land and 0.17 square miles (0.44 km^{2}) (or 0.38%) is water.

=== Unincorporated towns ===
- Bogle Corner
- Brunswick
- Coalmont
- Howesville

(This list is based on USGS data and may include former settlements.)

=== Adjacent townships ===
- Perry Township (north)
- Harrison Township (northeast)
- Smith Township, Greene County (southeast)
- Wright Township, Greene County (south)
- Jackson Township, Sullivan County (west)
- Pierson Township, Vigo County (northwest)

=== Major highways ===
- Indiana State Road 48
- Indiana State Road 59
- Indiana State Road 159
- Indiana State Road 246
