= Coal Company Store =

- Formerly listed on the U.S. National Register of Historic Places
- Location: S. Harmony Rd., Harmony, Indiana
- Area: less than one acre
- Built: 1880
- Architectural style: Rectangular Plan
- NRHP reference No.: 86001121

Significant dates
- Added to NRHP: May 22, 1986
- Removed from NRHP: February 7, 1992

Coal Company Store, also known as Independent Order of Red Men Fraternal Lodge, was a historic company store located at Harmony, Indiana. It was built in 1880, and was a two-story, rectangular, red brick building with a slate covered gable roof. It featured round arch window and door openings. The store operated until 1904, after which it was occupied by a local chapter of the Independent Order of Red Men and later a Baptist church.

It was added to the National Register of Historic Places in 1986 and delisted in 1992.

== See also ==
- List of Improved Order of Red Men buildings and structures
- National Register of Historic Places listings in Clay County, Indiana
