= Swalls, Indiana =

- Unincorporated community
- Vigo County's location in Indiana

- location in Vigo County, Indiana
- Coordinates: 39°27′37″N 87°17′20″W
- Country: United States
- State: Indiana
- County: Vigo County
- Township: Lost Creek
- Elevation: 594 ft (181 m)
- Time zone: UTC-5 (Eastern (EST))
  - Summer (DST): UTC-4 (EDT)
- ZIP code: 47803
- Area codes: 812, 930
- GNIS feature ID: 444453

Swalls is an unincorporated community in Lost Creek Township, Vigo County, in the U.S. state of Indiana. It is part of the Terre Haute metropolitan area.

The town is home to Swalls Cemetery.

== History ==
A post office was established at Swalls in 1891, and remained in operation until it was discontinued in 1900.

== Geography ==
Swalls is located at 39°27′37″N 87°17′20″W at an elevation of 594 feet.
