= Asherville, Indiana =

Asherville
- Unincorporated community
- Location in Clay County
- Coordinates: 39°28′29″N 87°03′44″W
- Country: United States
- State: Indiana
- County: Clay
- Township: Jackson
- Elevation: 659 ft (201 m)
- ZIP code: 47834
- FIPS code: 18-02368
- GNIS feature ID: 447632

Asherville is an unincorporated community in Jackson Township, Clay County, Indiana. It is part of the Terre Haute Metropolitan Statistical Area.

== History ==
John Asher laid out Asherville in 1873. At the same time, a post office was built and remained in operation until its discontinuation in 1912.

== Geography ==
Asherville is located at 39°28′29″N 87°03′44″W.
