= Donaldsonville, Indiana =

Unincorporated community in Indiana, U.S.

Coordinates: 39°31′45″N 87°05′56″W

Donaldsonville was an unincorporated community in Clay County, Indiana, in the United States. The area it comprised is now a part of the city of Brazil.

== History ==
Donaldson was the maiden name of the founder. Although this was originally an independent community between the city of Brazil and the town of Knightsville, in practice the community of Donaldsonville has been absorbed by and annexed into the city of Brazil.
