= Lost Creek Township, Vigo County, Indiana =

Lost Creek Township
- Township
- Location in Vigo County
- Coordinates: 39°28′38″N 87°17′40″W
- Country: United States
- State: Indiana
- County: Vigo

Government
  - Type: Indiana township

Area
  - Total: 35.77 sq mi (92.6 km^{2})
  - Land: 35.23 sq mi (91.2 km^{2})
  - Water: 0.54 sq mi (1.4 km^{2}) 1.51%
- Elevation: 564 ft (172 m)

Population (2020)
  - Total: 11,199
  - Density: 297.9/sq mi (115.0/km^{2})
- Time zone: UTC-5 (Eastern (EST))
  - Summer (DST): UTC-4 (EDT)
- ZIP codes: 47803, 47805, 47834
- Area code: 812
- GNIS feature ID: 453581
- Website: www.lctrustee.com

Lost Creek Township is one of twelve townships in Vigo County, Indiana, United States. As of the 2010 census, its population was 11,199 and it contained 4,236 housing units. It contains Terre Haute, Indiana's eastern, suburban end, along with the affluent Hulman family ranch and the Terre Haute International Airport originally named after the family. Seelyville, the third largest city in the county, is also located there.

== History ==
Lost Creek Township was founded in 1831 and many of the early settlers were freedmen who came from Virginia, Maryland, Pennsylvania, and North Carolina, who came to Indiana, along with several Quakers, on a road known as the "Wilderness Road."

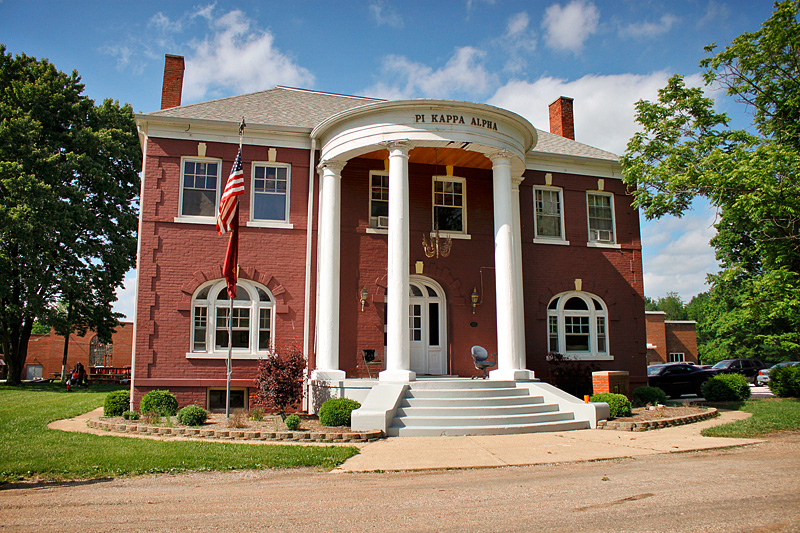
Vigo County Home for Dependent Children

In 1874, Chauncey Rose opened Rose-Hulman Polytechnic Institute, now known as Rose-Hulman Institute of Technology, in Lost Creek Township.

Vigo County Home for Dependent Children was listed on the National Register of Historic Places in 2000.

In 2024, the Terre Haute Casino Resort was opened by the entertainment company Churchill Downs Incorporated after the closure of Gary, Indiana's Majestic Star Casino.

== Geography ==
According to the 2010 census, the township has a total area of 35.77 square miles (92.6 km^{2}), of which 35.23 square miles (91.2 km^{2}) (or 98.49%) is land and 0.54 square miles (1.4 km^{2}) (or 1.51%) is water.

=== Cities, towns, villages ===
- Seelyville
- Terre Haute (east side)

=== Unincorporated communities ===
- Cherryvale
- East Glenn
- Glenn Ayr
- Gospel Grove
- Grange Corner
- Swalls
- Tabertown

=== Adjacent townships ===
- Nevins Township (northeast)
- Posey Township, Clay County (east)
- Perry Township, Clay County (southeast)
- Riley Township (south)
- Honey Creek Township (southwest)
- Harrison Township (west)
- Otter Creek Township (northwest)

=== Cemeteries ===
The township contains at least these sixteen named cemeteries: Baker-Coltrin, Babtist-Moses, Calvary, Chamberlain, Cheek, Dickerson, Highland Lawn, Hobmeyer-Trueblood-Ladd-Habermeyer, Hoskins, Hyde, Mewhinney, Patterson, Roberts, Swalls, Turner-Shcolfield, and Wood. As well as at least four unnamed family plots.

=== Airports and landing strips ===
- Hulman Field

=== Lakes/ Reservoirs ===
- Hulmans Lake
- Llewellyn Lake
- Maple Avenue Lake
- Dobbs Lake
- Thompson Lake
- Hulman Street Reservoir (Majority)

=== Housing Developments ===
- Terre Vista
- Lincolnshire/ Woodshire
- Village Quarter
- Watertree
- Wyndham
- Phoenix Hills
- Robinwood
- Hawthorn Woods
- Deming Estates
- Eastland
- Chamberlain Heights
- Huntington Estates
- Sycamore Terrace
- Woodridge

== Demographics ==
According to the census of 2000, there were 9,907 people and 3,968 households residing in the township. In the 2020 census, a recorded 11,199 people lived in Lost Creek township, showing a 13% increase from 2000. The population density was 281/mi^{2}. The racial makeup of the township is 86.91% White, 2.61% Black or African American, 0.19% Native American, 4.42% Asian, less than 0.1% Pacific Islander, 0.91% from other races, and 4.97% from two or more races. 2.96% of the population were Hispanic or Latino of any race.

The average household size was 2.44 and the average family size was 2.98. The median age was 34.3 years. For every 100 females, there were 113 males.

The median income for a household in the township was $81,198, and the median income for a family was $109,358. The per capita income for the township was $43,000. 12.2% of the population was below the poverty line.

43.2% of the population has a bachelor's degree or higher, with 19% of the population having a graduate degree and 20.7% having no college education and 22.5% having some form of college education but no degree.

4.9% of the school-enrolled population is enrolled in Nursery School/ Preschool, 38.9% is enrolled in kindergarten to 12th Grade,5.8% is enrolled in graduate degree courses, and 50.4% of the school population is enrolled in undergraduate college courses.

57.4% of the population is employed, and the most common employment is Educational Services, Healthcare, and Social Services.

== Education ==
Lost Creek Township is overseen by the Vigo County School Corporation. High Schools provided are Terre Haute North Vigo High School and Terre Haute South Vigo High School, both of which are outside of the township. Lost Creek Elementary School serves Kindergarteners & 1st-5th grade students and is located in Lost Creek township, and Otter Creek Middle School, Woodrow Wilson Junior High School, Honey Creek Middle School, and Sarah Scott Middle School serve the Township's 6-8th Grade students.

Rose-Hulman Institute of Technology is located in Lost Creek Township, and is considered one of the best Engineering Schools in the United States.

== Political districts ==
- Indiana's 8th congressional district
- State House District 43
- State Senate District 38

== Notable people ==
- Al Barker, baseball player
- Brian Dorsett, baseball player
