= Gospel Grove, Indiana =

- Unincorporated community
- Vigo County's location in Indiana

- location in Vigo County, Indiana
- Coordinates: 39°28′35″N 87°17′34″W
- Country: United States
- State: Indiana
- County: Vigo
- Township: Lost Creek
- Elevation: 574 ft (175 m)
- Time zone: UTC-5 (Eastern (EST))
  - Summer (DST): UTC-4 (EDT)
- ZIP code: 47803
- Area codes: 812, 930
- GNIS feature ID: 435236

Gospel Grove is an unincorporated community in central Lost Creek Township, Vigo County, in the U.S. state of Indiana.

It is part of the Terre Haute metropolitan area.

== Geography ==
Gospel Grove is located at 39°28′35″N 87°17′34″W at an elevation of 574 feet.
