= Nevins Township, Vigo County, Indiana =

Nevins Township
- Township
- Location in Vigo County
- Coordinates: 39°33′51″N 87°14′54″W
- Country: United States
- State: Indiana
- County: Vigo

Government
  - Type: Indiana township

Area
  - Total: 30.74 sq mi (79.6 km^{2})
  - Land: 30.56 sq mi (79.2 km^{2})
  - Water: 0.18 sq mi (0.47 km^{2}) 0.59%
- Elevation: 594 ft (181 m)

Population (2020)
  - Total: 1,869
  - Density: 64.6/sq mi (24.9/km^{2})
- Time zone: UTC-5 (Eastern (EST))
  - Summer (DST): UTC-4 (EDT)
- ZIP codes: 47805, 47834, 47874
- GNIS feature ID: 453659

Nevins Township is one of twelve townships in Vigo County, Indiana, United States. As of the 2010 census, its population was 1,975 and it contained 881 housing units.

== Geography ==
According to the 2010 census, the township has a total area of 30.74 square miles (79.6 km^{2}), of which 30.56 square miles (79.2 km^{2}) (or 99.41%) is land and 0.18 square miles (0.47 km^{2}) (or 0.59%) is water.

=== Unincorporated communities ===
- Coal Bluff
- Cobb
- Ehrmandale
- Fontanet

=== Adjacent townships ===
- Raccoon Township, Parke County (northeast)
- Dick Johnson Township, Clay County (east)
- Posey Township, Clay County (southeast)
- Lost Creek Township (southwest)
- Otter Creek Township (west)
- Florida Township, Parke County (northwest)

=== Cemeteries ===
The township contains these four cemeteries: Cress, Harpold, Richer and Sullian.

=== Lakes ===
- Morey Lake
- Spring Lake

== School districts ==
- Vigo County School Corporation

== Political districts ==
- Indiana's 8th congressional district
- State House District 44
- State Senate District 38
