= Turner, Indiana =

Turner
- Unincorporated town
- Location in Clay County
- Coordinates: 39°29′54″N 87°09′37″W
- Country: United States
- State: Indiana
- County: Clay
- Township: Posey
- Elevation: 673 ft (205 m)
- ZIP code: 47834
- FIPS code: 18-76832
- GNIS feature ID: 444989

Turner is an unincorporated town in Posey Township, Clay County, Indiana. It is part of the Terre Haute Metropolitan Statistical Area.

== Geography ==
Turner is located at 39°29′54″N 87°09′37″W.

== History ==
Turner was originally known as Newburg and was founded as such in 1854 by Joshua Modesitt along the Terre Haute and Indianapolis railroad. The post office was renamed Turner during the 1870s. When once thriving, the town had several general stores, a pottery, a United Brethran congregation, and several schools. The railroad is no longer in existence, although one can still observe evidence of such in the form of cleared paths through thickets in and around the town.
