= Cobb, Indiana =

- Unincorporated community
- Vigo County's location in Indiana

- location in Vigo County, Indiana
- Coordinates: 39°34′52″N 87°13′24″W
- Country: United States
- State: Indiana
- County: Vigo
- Township: Nevins
- Elevation: 551 ft (168 m)
- Time zone: UTC-5 (Eastern (EST))
  - Summer (DST): UTC-4 (EDT)
- ZIP code: 47874
- Area codes: 812, 930
- GNIS feature ID: 432716

Cobb is an unincorporated community in northern Nevins Township, Vigo County, in the U.S. state of Indiana.

It is part of the Terre Haute metropolitan area.

== Geography ==
Cobb is located at 39°34′52″N 87°13′24″W at an elevation of 551 feet.
