= Bogle Corner, Indiana =

Bogle Corner
- Unincorporated community
- Location in Clay County
- Coordinates: 39°10′39″N 87°11′05″W
- Country: United States
- State: Indiana
- County: Clay
- Township: Lewis
- Elevation: 604 ft (184 m)
- GNIS feature ID: 431296

Bogle Corner is an unincorporated community in Lewis Township, Clay County, Indiana. It is part of the Terre Haute Metropolitan Statistical Area.

== History ==
The Bogle family lent the community its name.
