= Cardonia, Indiana =

Cardonia
- Unincorporated community
- Location in Clay County
- Coordinates: 39°33′42″N 87°06′28″W
- Country: United States
- State: Indiana
- County: Clay
- Township: Van Buren
- Elevation: 682 ft (208 m)
- ZIP code: 47834
- FIPS code: 18-10234
- GNIS feature ID: 432127

Cardonia is an unincorporated community in Van Buren Township, Clay County, Indiana. It is part of the Terre Haute Metropolitan Statistical Area.

== History ==
Cardonia was founded in the year 1871 as a coal mining town. It was named for John F. Card, a mining official. A post office was established in Cardonia in 1879, and remained in operation until it was discontinued in 1909.

== Geography ==
Cardonia is located at 39°33′42″N 87°06′28″W.
