= Ehrmandale, Indiana =

- Unincorporated community
- Vigo County's location in Indiana

- location in Vigo County, Indiana
- Coordinates: 39°32′06″N 87°14′20″W
- Country: United States
- State: Indiana
- County: Vigo
- Township: Nevins
- Elevation: 594 ft (181 m)
- Time zone: UTC-5 (Eastern (EST))
  - Summer (DST): UTC-4 (EDT)
- ZIP code: 47805
- Area codes: 812, 930
- GNIS feature ID: 434047

Ehrmandale is an unincorporated community in southern Nevins Township, Vigo County, in the U.S. state of Indiana.

It is part of the Terre Haute metropolitan area.

== History ==
Ehrmandale was known as Elsie until 1898. A post office was established under this name in 1896, was renamed Ehrmandale in 1898, and was discontinued in 1905.

== Geography ==
Ehrmandale is located at 39°32′06″N 87°14′20″W at an elevation of 594 feet.
