= Carbon, Indiana =

- Town
- Location of Carbon in Clay County, Indiana.
- Coordinates: 39°35′56″N 87°6′27″W
- Country: United States
- State: Indiana
- County: Clay
- Township: Van Buren
- Founded: 1870
- Incorporated: 1875

Area
  - Total: 0.15 sq mi (0.39 km^{2})
  - Land: 0.15 sq mi (0.39 km^{2})
  - Water: 0 sq mi (0.00 km^{2})
- Elevation: 690 ft (210 m)

Population (2020)
  - Total: 263
  - Density: 1,767.2/sq mi (682.31/km^{2})
- Time zone: UTC-5 (EST)
  - Summer (DST): UTC-5 (EST)
- ZIP code: 47837
- Area code: 812
- FIPS code: 18-10198
- GNIS feature ID: 0432123
- Website: townofcarbon.com

Carbon is a town in Van Buren Township, Clay County, Indiana, United States. The population was 263 at the 2020 census. It is part of the Terre Haute Metropolitan Statistical Area.

== History ==
Carbon had its start by the building of the railroad through that territory. A post office was established at Carbon in 1870. It was named after the Carbon Coal Company.

== Geography ==
Carbon is located at 39°35′56″N 87°6′27″W (39.598974, -87.107510) and according to the 2010 census has a total area of 0.16 square miles (0.41 km^{2}), all land.

A smaller settlement, identified on old maps as either South Carbon or Pontiac, stood on the south edge of town near what is now the intersection of Poplar Street and County Road 1400 North.

== Demographics ==
Historical population
Census	Pop.	Note	%±
1880	600		—
1890	521		−13.2%
1900	951		82.5%
1910	493		−48.2%
1920	572		16.0%
1930	476		−16.8%
1940	510		7.1%
1950	480		−5.9%
1960	409		−14.8%
1970	344		−15.9%
1980	307		−10.8%
1990	350		14.0%
2000	334		−4.6%
2010	397		18.9%
2020	263		−33.8%
U.S. Decennial Census

=== 2010 census ===
As of the census of 2010, there were 397 people, 138 households, and 98 families living in the town. The population density was 2,481.3 inhabitants per square mile (958.0/km^{2}). There were 165 housing units at an average density of 1,031.3 per square mile (398.2/km^{2}). The racial makeup of the town was 96.7% White, 2.3% from other races, and 1.0% from two or more races. Hispanic or Latino of any race were 3.0% of the population.

There were 138 households, of which 41.3% had children under the age of 18 living with them, 55.8% were married couples living together, 8.7% had a female householder with no husband present, 6.5% had a male householder with no wife present, and 29.0% were non-families. 21.0% of all households were made up of individuals, and 9.4% had someone living alone who was 65 years of age or older. The average household size was 2.88 and the average family size was 3.40.

The median age in the town was 35.6 years. 30.7% of residents were under the age of 18; 7.3% were between the ages of 18 and 24; 26.4% were from 25 to 44; 26.4% were from 45 to 64; and 9.1% were 65 years of age or older. The gender makeup of the town was 50.6% male and 49.4% female.

=== 2000 census ===
As of the census of 2000, there were 334 people, 122 households, and 86 families living in the town. The population density was 2,109.4 inhabitants per square mile (814.4/km^{2}). There were 136 housing units at an average density of 858.9 per square mile (331.6/km^{2}). The racial makeup of the town was 99.70% White, and 0.30% from two or more races. Hispanic or Latino of any race were 1.20% of the population.

There were 122 households, out of which 41.8% had children under the age of 18 living with them, 54.1% were married couples living together, 12.3% had a female householder with no husband present, and 29.5% were non-families. 25.4% of all households were made up of individuals, and 8.2% had someone living alone who was 65 years of age or older. The average household size was 2.74 and the average family size was 3.28.

In the town, the population was spread out, with 31.4% under the age of 18, 10.5% from 18 to 24, 30.5% from 25 to 44, 16.5% from 45 to 64, and 11.1% who were 65 years of age or older. The median age was 30 years. For every 100 females, there were 92.0 males. For every 100 females age 18 and over, there were 94.1 males.

The median income for a household in the town was $35,208, and the median income for a family was $37,656. Males had a median income of $25,341 versus $22,500 for females. The per capita income for the town was $13,089. About 15.5% of families and 14.8% of the population were below the poverty line, including 14.3% of those under age 18 and 24.2% of those age 65 or over.
