= Glenn Ayr, Indiana =

- Unincorporated community
- Vigo County's location in Indiana

- location in Vigo County, Indiana
- Coordinates: 39°28′19″N 87°17′43″W
- Country: United States
- State: Indiana
- County: Vigo
- Township: Lost Creek
- Elevation: 577 ft (176 m)
- Time zone: UTC-5 (Eastern (EST))
  - Summer (DST): UTC-4 (EDT)
- ZIP code: 47803
- Area codes: 812, 930
- GNIS feature ID: 435117

Glenn Ayr or Glenn Ayre is an unincorporated community in central Lost Creek Township, Vigo County, in the U.S. state of Indiana.

It is part of the Terre Haute metropolitan area.

== History ==
Glenn Ayr had its start as a mining community, and was named after the Glen Ayr Coal Company. A post office was established under the name Glenn in 1887, and remained in operation until it was discontinued in 1902.

== Geography ==
Glenn Ayr is located at 39°28′19″N 87°17′43″W at an elevation of 577 feet.
