= Billville, Indiana =

Billville
- Unincorporated community
- Location in Clay County
- Coordinates: 39°30′13″N 87°07′32″W
- Country: United States
- State: Indiana
- County: Clay
- Township: Posey
- Elevation: 663 ft (202 m)
- ZIP code: 47834
- FIPS code: 18-05302
- GNIS feature ID: 431088

Billville is an unincorporated community in Posey Township, Clay County, Indiana. It is part of the Terre Haute Metropolitan Statistical Area.
