= Hoosierville, Indiana =

Hoosierville
- Unincorporated community
- Location in Clay County
- Coordinates: 39°28′30″N 87°06′30″W
- Country: United States
- State: Indiana
- County: Clay
- Township: Jackson
- Elevation: 653 ft (199 m)
- ZIP code: 47834
- FIPS code: 18-34690
- GNIS feature ID: 436417

Hoosierville is an unincorporated community in Jackson Township, Clay County, Indiana. It is part of the Terre Haute Metropolitan Statistical Area.

== History ==
A post office was established at Hoosierville in 1874, and remained in operation until it was discontinued in 1902. It was named from Indiana's official demonym, Hoosier.

Mining was originally the primary industry of Hoosierville.

== Geography ==
Hoosierville is located at 39°28′30″N 87°06′30″W.
