= Perth, Indiana =

Perth
- Unincorporated community
- Location in Clay County
- Coordinates: 39°35′35″N 87°09′43″W
- Country: United States
- State: Indiana
- County: Clay
- Township: Dick Johnson
- Elevation: 630 ft (190 m)
- ZIP code: 47837
- FIPS code: 18-59310
- GNIS feature ID: 441045

Perth is an unincorporated community in Dick Johnson Township, Clay County, Indiana. It is part of the Terre Haute Metropolitan Statistical Area.

== Geography ==
Perth is located at 39°35′35″N 87°09′43″W.

== History ==
Perth had its start in the year 1870 by the building of the railroad through that territory. It was named after Perth, Scotland, not Perth, Western Australia. A post office was established at Perth in 1880, and remained in operation until it was discontinued in 1929.
