= Harmony, Indiana =

- Town
- Location of Harmony in Clay County, Indiana.
- Coordinates: 39°32′7″N 87°4′26″W
- Country: United States
- State: Indiana
- County: Clay
- Township: Van Buren

Area
  - Total: 0.82 sq mi (2.13 km^{2})
  - Land: 0.82 sq mi (2.13 km^{2})
  - Water: 0 sq mi (0.00 km^{2})
- Elevation: 719 ft (219 m)

Population (2020)
  - Total: 677
  - Density: 823.3/sq mi (317.87/km^{2})
- Time zone: UTC-5 (EST)
  - Summer (DST): UTC-5 (EST)
- ZIP code: 47853
- Area code: 812
- FIPS code: 18-31486
- GNIS feature ID: 0435746

Harmony is a town in Van Buren Township, Clay County, Indiana, United States. As of the 2020 census, Harmony had a population of 677. It is part of the Terre Haute Metropolitan Statistical Area.

== History ==
Harmony was platted in 1864, although there had long been a small settlement at the site.

Coal Company Store was listed on the National Register of Historic Places between 1986 and 1992.

== Geography ==
Harmony is located at 39°32′07″N 87°04′26″W.

According to the 2010 census, Harmony has a total area of 0.74 square miles (1.92 km^{2}), all land.

== Demographics ==
Historical population
Census	Pop.	Note	%±
1870	597		—
1880	838		40.4%
1890	1,020		21.7%
1980	613		—
1990	645		5.2%
2000	589		−8.7%
2010	656		11.4%
2020	677		3.2%
U.S. Decennial Census

=== 2010 census ===
As of the census of 2010, there were 656 people, 265 households, and 176 families living in the town. The population density was 874.7 inhabitants per square mile (337.7/km^{2}). There were 292 housing units at an average density of 389.3 per square mile (150.3/km^{2}). The racial makeup of the town was 97.6% White, 0.8% African American, 0.3% Asian, 0.9% from other races, and 0.5% from two or more races. Hispanic or Latino of any race were 1.2% of the population.

There were 265 households, of which 34.7% had children under the age of 18 living with them, 48.3% were married couples living together, 13.2% had a female householder with no husband present, 4.9% had a male householder with no wife present, and 33.6% were non-families. 30.2% of all households were made up of individuals, and 12.4% had someone living alone who was 65 years of age or older. The average household size was 2.48 and the average family size was 3.04.

The median age in the town was 38.6 years. 25.2% of residents were under the age of 18; 9.4% were between the ages of 18 and 24; 25% were from 25 to 44; 27% were from 45 to 64; and 13.6% were 65 years of age or older. The gender makeup of the town was 45.3% male and 54.7% female.

=== 2000 census ===
According to the census of 2000, there were 589 people, 241 households, and 160 families living in the town. The population density was 781.0 inhabitants per square mile (301.5/km^{2}). There were 255 housing units at an average density of 338.1 per square mile (130.5/km^{2}). The racial makeup of the town was 97.62% White, 0.17% African American, 0.34% Asian, 0.51% from other races, and 1.36% from two or more races.

There were 241 households, out of which 34.4% had children under the age of 18 living with them, 52.3% were married couples living together, 11.2% had a female householder with no husband present, and 33.6% were non-families. 27.8% of all households were made up of individuals, and 10.8% had someone living alone who was 65 years of age or older. The average household size was 2.44 and the average family size was 2.99.

In the town, the population was spread out, with 28.2% under the age of 18, 8.3% from 18 to 24, 27.8% from 25 to 44, 22.1% from 45 to 64, and 13.6% who were 65 years of age or older. The median age was 35 years. For every 100 females, there were 82.9 males. For every 100 females age 18 and over, there were 83.1 males.

The median income for a household in the town was $33,438, and the median income for a family was $41,750. Males had a median income of $31,406 versus $21,333 for females. The per capita income for the town was $16,276. About 7.2% of families and 8.2% of the population were below the poverty line, including 12.2% of those under age 18 and 8.0% of those age 65 or over.
