= Cloverland, Indiana =

Cloverland
- Unincorporated community
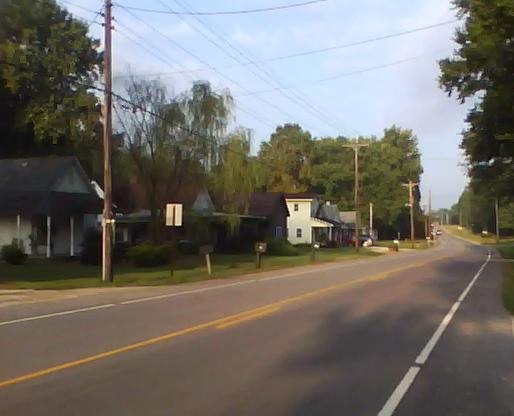
- Cloverland, Indiana, along State Road 340

- Location in Clay County
- Coordinates: 39°30′05″N 87°13′53″W
- Country: United States
- State: Indiana
- County: Clay
- Township: Posey
- Elevation: 607 ft (185 m)
- ZIP code: 47834
- FIPS code: 18-13888
- GNIS feature ID: 432691

Cloverland is an unincorporated community in Posey Township, Clay County, Indiana. It is part of the Terre Haute Metropolitan Statistical Area.

== Geography ==
Cloverland is located at 39°30′05″N 87°13′53″W, about six miles west of the county seat, Brazil, and less than one mile east of the Vigo-Clay line. Cloverland is within the humid continental climate zone. The terrain is gently rolling and includes a small brook.

== History ==
The town was platted in 1834 as a speculative venture by Terre Haute doctor Charles Modesitt. The town grew steadily with several general stores, a carpentry shop, and several other ventures. With the construction of the railroad, business activity shifted to nearby Brazil, and the town's population dwindled. A post office was established at Cloverland in 1850, and remained in operation until it was discontinued in 1920. Today, a church, a commercial building, and cluster of houses are all that remain.

== Demographics ==
The United States Census Bureau delineated Cloverland as a census designated place in the 2022 American Community Survey.
