= Seelyville, Indiana =

- Town
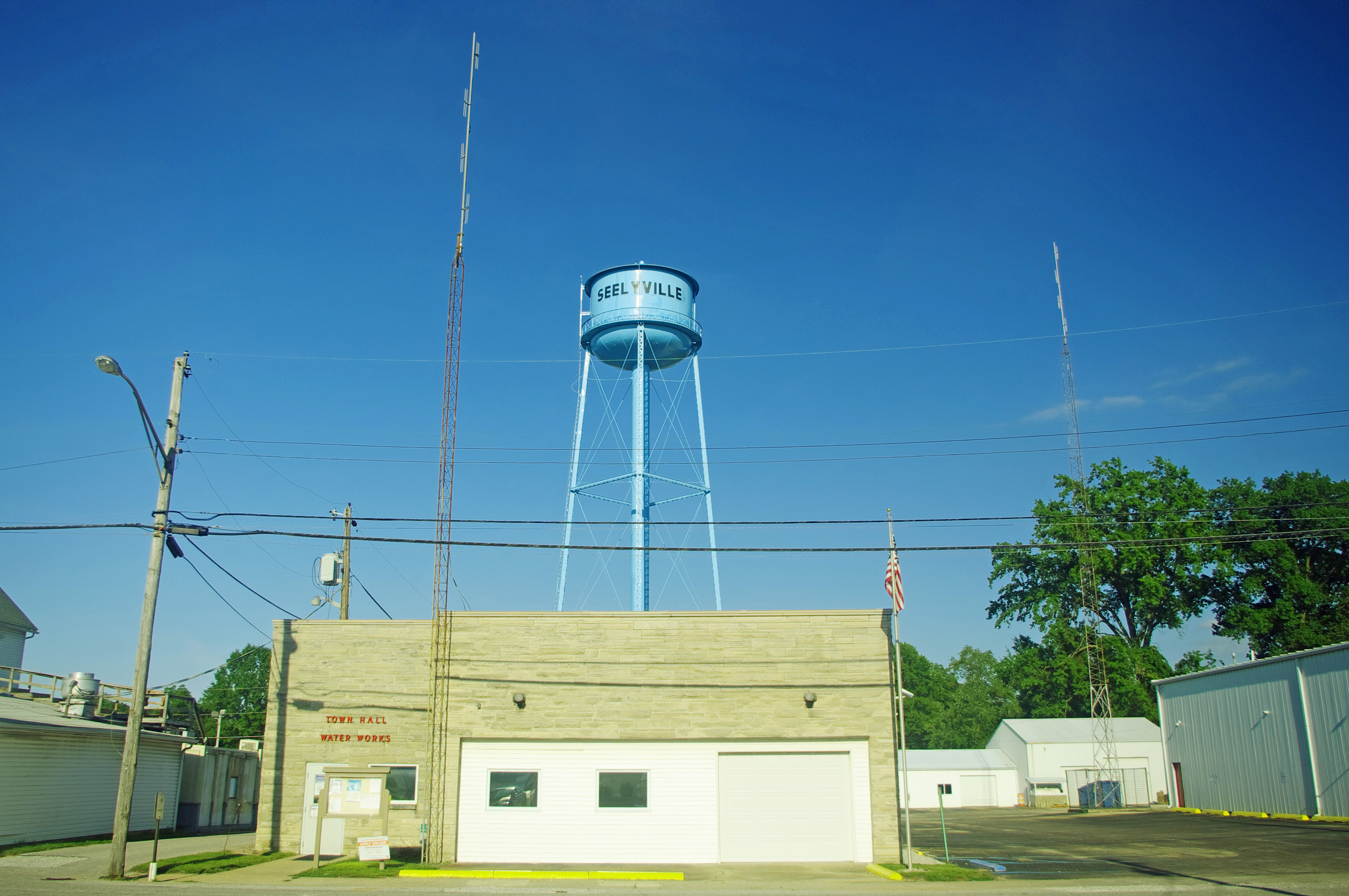
- Town Hall and water tower

- Location of Seelyville in Vigo County, Indiana.
- Coordinates: 39°29′52″N 87°15′29″W
- Country: United States
- State: Indiana
- County: Vigo
- Township: Lost Creek

Area
  - Total: 0.91 sq mi (2.35 km^{2})
  - Land: 0.89 sq mi (2.30 km^{2})
  - Water: 0.019 sq mi (0.05 km^{2})
- Elevation: 587 ft (179 m)

Population (2020)
  - Total: 1,012
  - Density: 1,139.9/sq mi (440.13/km^{2})
- Time zone: UTC−5 (Eastern (EST))
  - Summer (DST): UTC−4 (EDT)
- ZIP code: 47878
- Area code: 812
- FIPS code: 18-68652
- GNIS feature ID: 2396910
- Website: seelyville-in.gov

Seelyville is a town in Lost Creek Township, Vigo County, in the U.S. state of Indiana. As of the 2020 census, Seelyville had a population of 1,012. It is part of the Terre Haute Metropolitan Statistical Area.

== History ==
Seelyville was originally called the "Woodsmills." The town was laid out by Moddisett, the owner of the land north of the Jonas Seely property. When the Terre Haute and Eastern Railroad was built along the south side of town, the small whistle stop station hired Jonas Seely as station master. The name was originally the Seely Station but was later changed to Seelyville Station. The town expanded with the opening of the McKeen coal shaft, one of the earliest operated in the county. After passing through several hands, the mine closed operations in 1879. Others operated into the early 1900s. A post office was established in Seelyville in 1878.

== Geography ==
Seelyville lies east of Terre Haute along U.S. Route 40.

According to the 2010 census, Seelyville has a total area of 0.91 square miles (2.36 km^{2}), of which 0.89 square miles (2.31 km^{2}) (or 97.8%) is land and 0.02 square miles (0.05 km^{2}) (or 2.2%) is water.

=== Climate ===
The climate in this area is characterized by hot, humid summers and generally mild to cool winters. According to the Köppen climate classification system, Seelyville has a humid subtropical climate, abbreviated "Cfa" on climate maps.

== Demographics ==
Historical population
Census	Pop.	Note	%±
1910	1,188		—
1920	915		−23.0%
1930	825		−9.8%
1940	807		−2.2%
1950	898		11.3%
1960	1,114		24.1%
1970	1,195		7.3%
1980	1,374		15.0%
1990	1,090		−20.7%
2000	1,182		8.4%
2010	1,029		−12.9%
2020	1,012		−1.7%
U.S. Decennial Census

=== 2020 census ===
As of the 2020 census, Seelyville had a population of 1,012. The median age was 38.2 years. 23.3% of residents were under the age of 18 and 16.2% of residents were 65 years of age or older. For every 100 females there were 96.9 males, and for every 100 females age 18 and over there were 101.0 males age 18 and over.

100.0% of residents lived in urban areas, while 0.0% lived in rural areas.

There were 418 households in Seelyville, of which 32.8% had children under the age of 18 living in them. Of all households, 42.1% were married-couple households, 22.2% were households with a male householder and no spouse or partner present, and 26.1% were households with a female householder and no spouse or partner present. About 28.2% of all households were made up of individuals and 11.7% had someone living alone who was 65 years of age or older.

There were 464 housing units, of which 9.9% were vacant. The homeowner vacancy rate was 1.1% and the rental vacancy rate was 12.4%.

Racial composition as of the 2020 census
Race	Number	Percent
White	934	92.3%
Black or African American	4	0.4%
American Indian and Alaska Native	5	0.5%
Asian	7	0.7%
Native Hawaiian and Other Pacific Islander	0	0.0%
Some other race	13	1.3%
Two or more races	49	4.8%
Hispanic or Latino (of any race)	33	3.3%

=== 2010 census ===
As of the census of 2010, there were 1,029 people, 424 households, and 263 families living in the town. The population density was 1,156.2 inhabitants per square mile (446.4/km^{2}). There were 481 housing units at an average density of 540.4 per square mile (208.6/km^{2}). The racial makeup of the town was 97.8% White, 0.4% African American, 0.2% Native American, 0.2% Asian, 0.2% from other races, and 1.3% from two or more races. Hispanic or Latino of any race were 0.9% of the population.

There were 424 households, of which 31.4% had children under the age of 18 living with them, 44.8% were married couples living together, 12.7% had a female householder with no husband present, 4.5% had a male householder with no wife present, and 38.0% were non-families. 29.2% of all households were made up of individuals, and 10.6% had someone living alone who was 65 years of age or older. The average household size was 2.40 and the average family size was 2.99.

The median age in the town was 36.2 years. 23.2% of residents were under the age of 18; 10.4% were between the ages of 18 and 24; 27.5% were from 25 to 44; 27.5% were from 45 to 64; and 11.4% were 65 years of age or older. The gender makeup of the town was 50.0% male and 50.0% female.

=== 2000 census ===
As of the census of 2000, there were 1,182 people, 491 households, and 326 families living in the town. The population density was 1,371.4 inhabitants per square mile (529.5/km^{2}). There were 526 housing units at an average density of 610.3 per square mile (235.6/km^{2}). The racial makeup of the town was 98.39% White, 0.68% African American, 0.17% Asian, 0.42% from other races, and 0.34% from two or more races. Hispanic or Latino of any race were 0.85% of the population.

There were 491 households, out of which 32.2% had children under the age of 18 living with them, 53.0% were married couples living together, 9.2% had a female householder with no husband present, and 33.6% were non-families. 27.1% of all households were made up of individuals, and 10.6% had someone living alone who was 65 years of age or older. The average household size was 2.38 and the average family size was 2.90.

In the town, the age distribution of the population shows 24.1% under the age of 18, 8.3% from 18 to 24, 29.5% from 25 to 44, 24.5% from 45 to 64, and 13.6% who were 65 years of age or older. The median age was 37 years. For every 100 females, there were 96.0 males. For every 100 females age 18 and over, there were 95.9 males.

The median income for a household in the town was $35,114, and the median income for a family was $45,167. Males had a median income of $31,000 versus $21,326 for females. The per capita income for the town was $17,588. About 3.5% of families and 7.4% of the population were below the poverty line, including 5.3% of those under age 18 and 14.3% of those age 65 or over.

== Education ==
All areas in Vigo County are in the Vigo County School Corporation. Seelyville is zoned to Lost Creek Consolidated Elementary School, Woodrow Wilson Middle School, and Terre Haute North Vigo High School.

== Notable person ==
- Josh Devore, outfielder for the Cincinnati Reds, Philadelphia Phillies, New York Giants, and Boston Braves
