= Prairie City, Indiana =

Prairie City
- Unincorporated community
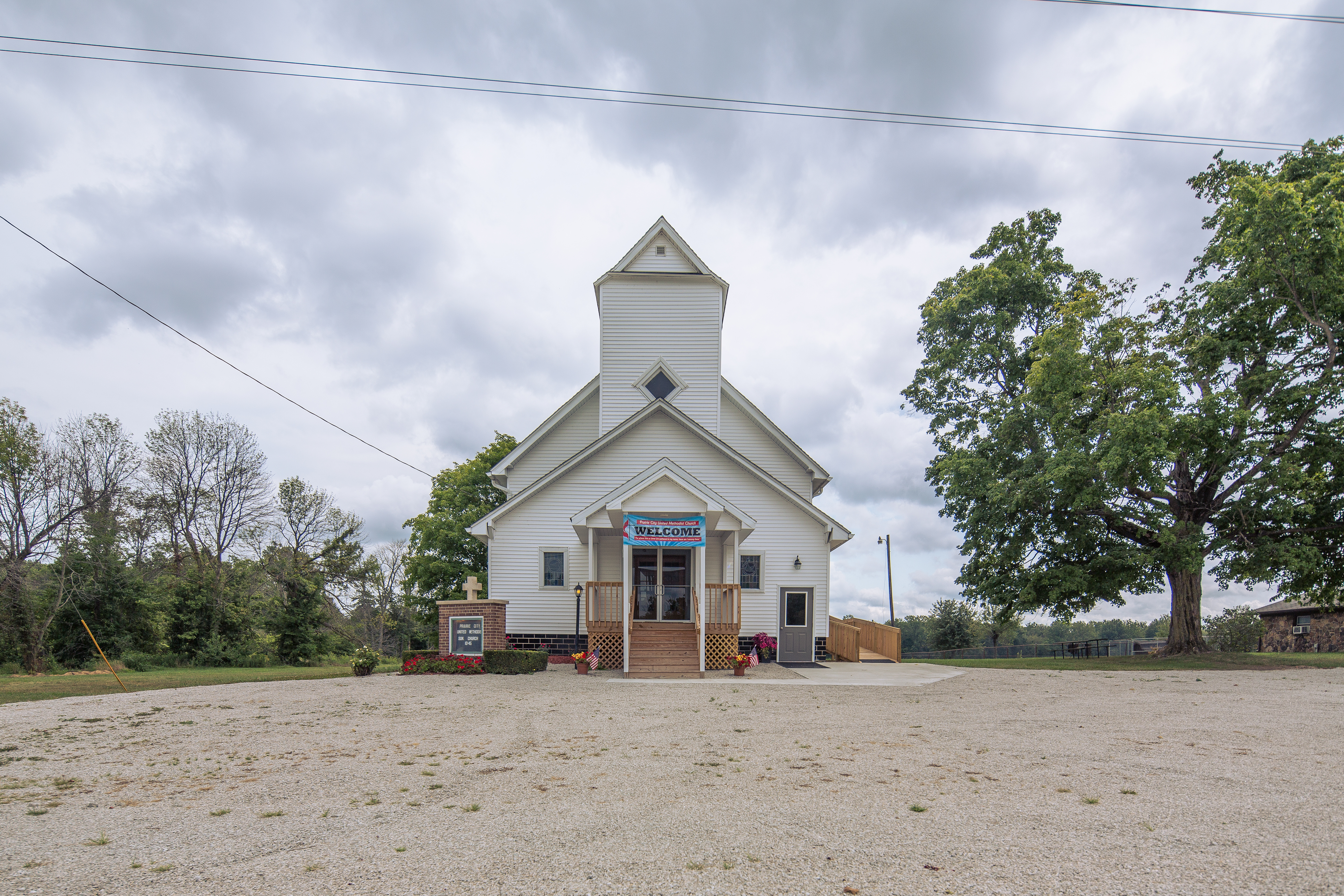

- Location in Clay County
- Coordinates: 39°26′44″N 87°06′48″W
- Country: United States
- State: Indiana
- County: Clay
- Township: Jackson
- Elevation: 587 ft (179 m)
- GNIS feature ID: 441539

Prairie City is an unincorporated community in Jackson Township, Clay County, Indiana. It is part of the Terre Haute Metropolitan Statistical Area. It is located on State Highway 42. It once included a one-room school, a small grocery which was a part of a house on the corner, a garage which did repairs on cars and tractors, and a few houses. The cemetery was across from the school, and both were across Birch Creek. The school was constructed of red brick, common in Clay County. In the 1940s–50s and probably before then the church was an EUB (Evangelical United Brethren).

== History ==
Prairie City was founded in 1869.

== Geography ==
Prairie City is located at 39°26′44″N 87°06′48″W.
