= Coal Bluff, Indiana =

- Unincorporated community
- Vigo County's location in Indiana

- location in Vigo County, Indiana
- Coordinates: 39°34′58″N 87°13′12″W
- Country: United States
- State: Indiana
- County: Vigo
- Township: Nevins
- Elevation: 551 ft (168 m)
- Time zone: UTC-5 (Eastern (EST))
  - Summer (DST): UTC-4 (EDT)
- ZIP code: 47874
- Area code: 812
- GNIS feature ID: 449640

Coal Bluff is an unincorporated community in northern Nevins Township, Vigo County, in the U.S. state of Indiana.

It is part of the Terre Haute metropolitan area.

== History ==
Coal Bluff grew to be a hamlet in consequence of Webster's coal mine, one of the first in the county being opened. Webster sold the mine to the Coal Bluff Mining Company, and hence the name of the place. In 1890 it was exclusively a mining town with a post office and a railroad station on the Indianapolis and St. Louis Railroad. At that time it had a population of approximately 176. Since the Coal Mines closed, Coal Bluff has now become a residential community. The post comes from Rosedale, Indiana, and the telephone numbers are from Clay County. There are farms in the area and a few prominent families.

A post office was established at Coal Bluff in 1876, and remained in operation until it was discontinued in 1969.

== Geography ==
Coal Bluff is located at 39°34′58″N 87°13′12″W at an elevation of 554 feet.
