= Calcutta, Indiana =

Unincorporated community in Indiana, U.S.

Coordinates: 39°36′15″N 87°04′10″W

Calcutta is an unincorporated community in Clay County, Indiana, United States.

== History ==
Calcutta was founded in 1870 as a coal town. A post office was established at Calcutta in 1870, and remained in operation until it was discontinued in 1879.
