= Cherryvale, Indiana =

- Unincorporated community
- Cherryvale, as seen in a map of Vigo County
- Coordinates: 39°27′48″N 87°14′22″W
- Country: United States
- State: Indiana
- County: Vigo, Clay
- Township: Lost Creek, Posey
- Elevation: 584 ft (178 m)
- Time zone: UTC-5 (Eastern (EST))
  - Summer (DST): UTC-4 (EDT)
- ZIP code: 47834
- Area codes: 812, 930
- GNIS feature ID: 432447

Cherryvale is an unincorporated community in Vigo and Clay counties, in the U.S. state of Indiana.

It is part of the Terre Haute metropolitan area.

== History ==
Cherryvale was not formally laid out or platted. A post office was established at Cherryvale in 1899, and remained in operation until it was discontinued in 1904.

== Geography ==
Cherryvale is located in western Clay County adjacent to the Vigo-Clay county line approximately one mile north of I-70.
