= Cottage Hill, Ohio =

Unincorporated community in Ohio, U.S.

Coordinates: 40°00′58″N 82°11′18″W

Cottage Hill is an unincorporated community in Muskingum County, in the U.S. state of Ohio.

== History ==
A post office called Cottage Hill was established in 1855, the name was changed to Cottagehill in 1895, and the post office closed in 1902. Besides the post office, Cottage Hill had a country store.
