= Howesville, Indiana =

Howesville
- Unincorporated community
- Location in Clay County
- Coordinates: 39°10′37″N 87°08′49″W
- Country: United States
- State: Indiana
- County: Clay
- Township: Lewis
- Elevation: 548 ft (167 m)
- ZIP code: 47438
- FIPS code: 18-35014
- GNIS feature ID: 436555

Howesville is an unincorporated community in Lewis Township, Clay County, Indiana. It is part of the Terre Haute Metropolitan Statistical Area.

== History ==
Howesville was laid out in 1856. A post office was established in Howesville in 1858, and remained in operation until it was discontinued in 1909.

== Geography ==
Howesville is located at 39°10′37″N 87°08′49″W.
