= Benwood, Indiana =

Benwood
- Unincorporated community
- Location in Clay County
- Coordinates: 39°33′40″N 87°05′39″W
- Country: United States
- State: Indiana
- County: Clay
- Township: Van Buren
- Elevation: 669 ft (204 m)
- ZIP code: 47834
- FIPS code: 18-04852
- GNIS feature ID: 430833

Benwood is an unincorporated community in Van Buren Township, Clay County, Indiana, United States. It is part of the Terre Haute Metropolitan Statistical Area.

A post office was established at Benwood in 1881, and remained in operation until it was discontinued in 1882. Benwood was likely named in honor of Ben Davis, a railroad official.

Mining was the originally the primary industry of Benwood.
