= Al Barker =

American baseball player (1839–1912)

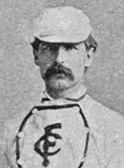
- Outfielder
- Born: January 18, 1839; Lost Creek, Indiana, U.S.
- Died: September 15, 1912 (aged 73); Rockford, Illinois, U.S.
- Batted: Unknown Threw: Unknown

Major league debut
- June 1, 1871, for the Rockford Forest Citys

Last major league appearance
- June 1, 1871, for the Rockford Forest Citys

Major league statistics
- Batting average: .250
- Home runs: 0
- Runs batted in: 2
- Stats at Baseball Reference

Teams
- Amateur Rockford Forest Citys (1865–1870) Mutual of Janesville (1870) Professional Rockford Forest Citys (1871)

Alfred L. Barker (January 18, 1839 – September 15, 1912) was an American amateur and professional baseball player. He played one major league (Note: Barker played his major league game in the National Association—some sources do not consider the National Association to be a major league.) game, in 1871, for the Rockford Forest Citys of the National Association.

Barker was one of the original players for the then-amateur Forest Citys when they were founded in 1865, but by the time the club joined the professional National Association in 1871, he was a backup who would appear in only one league game.

== Early life ==
Barker was born on January 18, 1839, in Lost Creek, Indiana, (Note: Some sources list his birthplace as nearby Terre Haute, Indiana.) to Ira and Margaret Barker. In 1848 his family moved to Daysville, Illinois, and then in 1853 settled in the area of Rockford.

Barker enlisted in the 11th Illinois Infantry Regiment at the beginning of the Civil War and after being mustered out after three months. In 1862 he reenlisted in the 74th Illinois Infantry Regiment. Al's brother Henry, also with the 74th Illinois, died fighting at the Battle of Kennesaw Mountain during the Atlanta Campaign.

== Baseball career ==
The Forest City Club of Rockford (Note: Known as the Rockford Forest Citys under modern team naming conventions.) was founded on June 7, 1865, with Barker serving both as one of the directors and as the team's catcher.

In 1867, the Washington Nationals, led by future Hall of Famer George Wright, embarked upon a tour of the American heartland, playing games in Columbus, Cincinnati, Louisville, St. Louis, and Chicago. While nominally amateur, the club was fully professional. Washington won the first seven games of their tour by large margins, before facing the Rockford club in Chicago on July 25. Captained by Barker and with 17 year old pitcher Al Spalding on the mound, Rockford delivered Washington their sole defeat of the trip, winning 29–23. Baseball historian John Thorn described it as the upset of the century. In that game, Barker executed what may have been a bunt, although the development of that tactic is generally credited to Tom Barlow a number of years afterwards.

As the years went on and the Forest Citys accumulated newer talent, including future major league stars Ross Barnes and Cap Anson, Barker was gradually relegated to a utility role. By 1870, he was playing only as a substitute for Rockford, but also played for the Mutuals of Janesville for a short time. He remained a substitute when Rockford joined the all-professional National Association the next year. By this time, he was the last remaining member from the original 1865 club.

He played in a single major league game that season, starting at left field on June 1, 1871, in a road game against the New York Mutuals. In five plate appearances he went 1-for-4 (a single) with a walk and had two runs batted in. In the field he made two putouts without an error.

== Personal life ==
Barker married Narcissa Tripp in between his two enlistments in the Civil War, but the union was short-lived. In 1872, he married Sarah Converse, and they remained together until she died in 1906. Together, they ran a dancing school in Rockford for over 25 years. He remained well-connected to baseball, umpiring three National League games in 1881 and participating in team reunions. In 1896, Barker played in baseball's first old-timer's game.

Barker died of stomach cancer on September 15, 1912, at the age of 72 in Rockford, Illinois.

== Notes ==
Records
Preceded by Dickey Pearce	Oldest recognized verified living baseball player September 18, 1908 – September 15, 1912	Succeeded by Al Reach
