= Clay County, Indiana =

County in Indiana, United States

- County
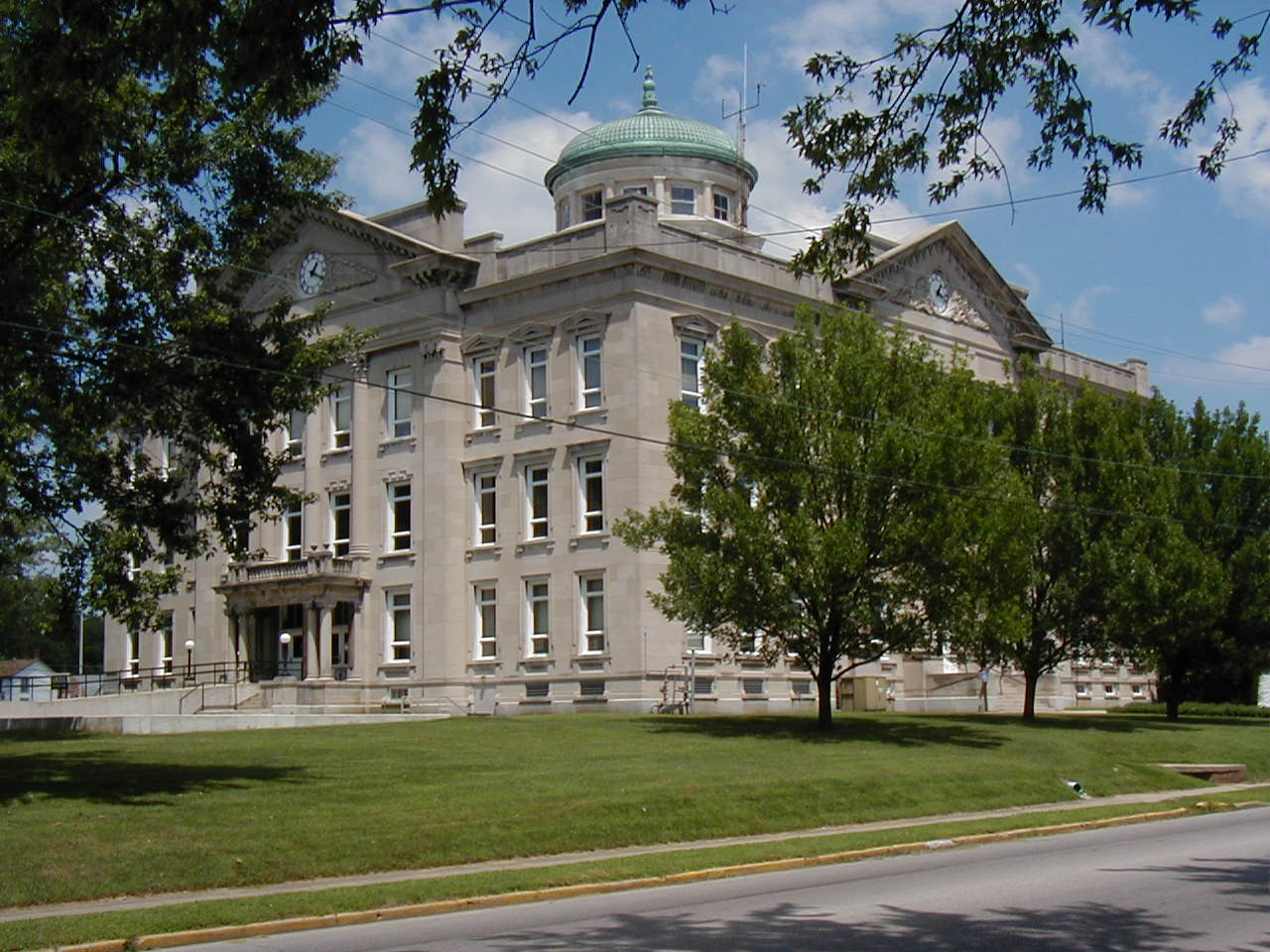
- Clay County Courthouse, Brazil

- Location within the U.S. state of Indiana
- Coordinates: 39°24′N 87°07′W
- Country: United States
- State: Indiana
- Founded: February 12, 1825
- Named for: Henry Clay
- Seat: Brazil
- Largest city: Brazil

Area
  - Total: 360.32 sq mi (933.2 km^{2})
  - Land: 357.54 sq mi (926.0 km^{2})
  - Water: 2.78 sq mi (7.2 km^{2}) 0.77%

Population (2020)
  - Total: 26,466
  - Estimate (2025): 26,410 ▼
  - Density: 74.022/sq mi (28.580/km^{2})
- Time zone: UTC−5 (Eastern)
  - Summer (DST): UTC−4 (EDT)
- Congressional district: 8th
- Website: Official website
- Indiana county number 11

Clay County is a county located in the U.S. state of Indiana. As of 2020, the population was 26,466. The county seat is Brazil. Clay County is included in the Terre Haute metropolitan area.

== History ==
The Indiana Legislature mandated Clay County in 1825, with territory partitioned from Owen, Putnam, Sullivan, and Vigo counties. Its name honors Henry Clay, a famous antebellum American statesman.

The first Courthouse was built in the newly platted town of Bowling Green in 1828. It was a two-story structure of hand-hewn logs.

By the late 1830s Clay County had grown to the extent that the first Courthouse could no longer provide adequate facilities. Therefore, a second Courthouse was constructed near the first Courthouse. This two-story brick structure served until destroyed by fire on November 30, 1851.

By the 1860s the towns of Harmony, Knightsville, and Brazil were growing rapidly, due in part to their location along the National Road, and also because of the many coal companies in that area. An effort to move the county seat of government to a more central location, which had begun in the 1850s, grew stronger creating controversy among citizens. In the 1860s citizens in the northern section of Clay County became more organized in their efforts. In 1871 brothers Robert and John Stewart donated land along the National Road in Brazil for a new courthouse. $5,300 was also raised by citizens in the area to entice the commissioners to move the seat of government from Bowling Green to Brazil. This amount was reportedly the value of the existing courthouse and grounds, thus defusing opponents' argument that abandoning the present courthouse would be a waste of taxpayers money. The relocation efforts, which began in 1871, were challenged in the Supreme Court. The relocation was finally granted in 1876.

In 1912 John W. Gaddis, a prominent architect in Vincennes, Indiana, entered into a contract with the County Commissioners to design, plan, and oversee the construction of a new courthouse. The construction bid of W.H. Bailey and Charles A. Koemer of Louisville, Kentucky was accepted in 1912 with the cornerstone being laid in the fall of 1912. Gaddis had completed several others: in Fairfield and Robinson, Illinois: Perryville, Missouri and two in Indiana, the Putnam County Courthouse in Greencastle (1905) and the Huntington County Courthouse (1906) in Huntington, which are also in Classical Revival mode.

The Clay County Courthouse, built in 1913–1914, is one of the most historically and architecturally significant buildings in Brazil and Clay County, Indiana. Built in Classical Revival style of architecture, it is the only building in Clay County holding county government offices and records. It is also located alongside the famed National Road (Cumberland Trail). The present building is the fifth Clay County Courthouse.

== Geography ==
According to the 2010 census, the county has a total area of 360.32 square miles (933.2 km^{2}), of which 357.54 square miles (926.0 km^{2}) (or 99.23%) is land and 2.78 square miles (7.2 km^{2}) (or 0.77%) is water.

=== Communities ===
==== City ====
- Brazil

==== Towns ====
- Carbon
- Center Point
- Clay City
- Harmony
- Knightsville
- Staunton

==== Census-designated place ====
- Coalmont

==== Unincorporated communities ====
- Art
- Ashboro
- Asherville
- Barrick Corner
- Benwood
- Billtown
- Billville
- Bogle Corner
- Bowling Green
- Brunswick
- Calcutta
- Cardonia
- Cherryvale
- Cloverland
- Cory
- Cottage Hill
- Donaldsonville (now part of Brazil)
- Eel River
- Hickory Island
- Hirt Corner (partial)
- Hoosierville
- Howesville
- Lena (partial - known as Marysville)
- Mechanicsburg
- New Brunswick
- Perth
- Poland
- Pontiac
- Prairie City
- Purdy Hill
- Saline City
- Stearleyville
- Turner
- Twin Beach
- Wickville
- Whitehall

==== Townships ====
- Brazil
- Cass
- Dick Johnson
- Harrison
- Jackson
- Lewis
- Perry
- Posey
- Sugar Ridge
- Van Buren
- Washington

=== Adjacent counties ===
- Parke County – north
- Putnam County – northeast
- Owen County – southeast
- Greene County – south
- Sullivan County – southwest
- Vigo County – west

== Education ==
The county has two high schools: Northview High School (grades 9–12) and Clay City High School (grades 7–12). There are 7 elementary schools: Van Buren Elementary, Jackson Township Elementary, Staunton Elementary, Meridian Street Elementary, Forest Park Elementary, East Side Elementary and Clay City Elementary. The Clay Community School Corporation is located in Brazil.

== Transportation ==
=== Major highways ===
- Interstate 70
- U.S. Route 40
- State Road 42
- State Road 46
- State Road 48
- State Road 59
- State Road 157
- State Road 159
- State Road 246
- State Road 340

=== Airport ===
The county contains one public-use airport: Brazil Clay County Airport (0I2), serving Brazil, Indiana.

== Climate and weather ==
Brazil, Indiana

Climate chart (precipitation, max. and min. temperature)
J	F	M	A	M	J	J	A	S	O	N	D
2.5 36 19	2.3 42 24	3.7 54 33	4.1 66 43	4.8 76 52	4.3 84 61	4.9 87 65	4.5 85 63	3.1 79 56	3.1 68 45	4.3 53 36	3.5 40 25
- █ Average max. and min. temperatures in °F
- █ Precipitation totals in inches
- Source: The Weather Channel
Metric conversion
J	F	M	A	M	J	J	A	S	O	N	D
65 2 −7	57 6 −4	94 12 1	104 19 6	121 24 11	108 29 16	124 31 18	114 29 17	78 26 13	77 20 7	108 12 2	89 4 −4
- █ Average max. and min. temperatures in °C
- █ Precipitation totals in mm

In recent years, average temperatures in Brazil have ranged from a low of 19 °F (−7 °C) in January to a high of 87 °F (31 °C) in July, although a record low of −25 °F (−32 °C) was recorded in January 1994 and a record high of 109 °F (43 °C) was recorded in July 1936. Average monthly precipitation ranged from 2.25 inches (57 mm) in February to 4.89 inches (124 mm) in July.

== Government ==
The county government is a constitutional body, and is granted specific powers by the Constitution of Indiana, and by the Indiana Code.

County Council: The county council is the legislative branch of the county government and controls all the spending and revenue collection in the county. Representatives are elected to four-year terms from county districts. They are responsible for setting salaries, the annual budget, and special spending. The council also has limited authority to impose local taxes, in the form of an income and property tax that is subject to state level approval, excise taxes, and service taxes.

Board of Commissioners: The Board of Commissioners serves as the county's executive body. The commissioners are elected county-wide to staggered four-year terms. The Board executes acts of the County Council, collects revenue, and runs the day-to-day functions of the county government.

Court: Clay County is served by two state-level trial courts: the Clay Circuit Court and the Clay Superior Court. Each court is overseen by an elected judge, whose term of office is six years. There are no term limits for Circuit or Superior Court judges in Indiana. The Clay Circuit Court has primary jurisdiction over juvenile and probate matters, and the Clay Superior Court has primary jurisdiction over misdemeanor and traffic offences. The courts share concurrent jurisdiction over felony criminal matters and civil cases. circuit court.

County Officials: The county has several other elected offices, including sheriff, coroner, auditor, treasurer, recorder, surveyor, and circuit court clerk. Each of these elected officers serves a term of four years and oversees a different part of county government. Members elected to county government positions are required to declare a party affiliation and to be residents of the county.

Clay County is part of Indiana's 8th congressional district; Indiana Senate districts 38 and 39; and Indiana House of Representatives districts 42, 44 and 46.

Clay County tends to vote Republican. Since 1888, county voters have chosen the Republican Party nominee in 73% (24 of 34) of the elections through 2024.

United States presidential election results for Clay County, Indiana
Year	Republican		Democratic		Third party(ies)	
Year	No.	%	No.	%	No.	%
1888	3,711	48.12%	3,773	48.92%	228	2.96%
1892	3,105	42.79%	3,558	49.04%	593	8.17%
1896	3,823	45.55%	4,482	53.40%	88	1.05%
1900	3,873	46.11%	4,114	48.98%	412	4.91%
1904	4,005	48.01%	3,565	42.74%	772	9.25%
1908	3,766	43.79%	4,204	48.88%	631	7.34%
1912	1,494	20.45%	3,297	45.12%	2,516	34.43%
1916	3,102	42.82%	3,435	47.42%	707	9.76%
1920	6,129	48.20%	5,612	44.13%	975	7.67%
1924	5,955	48.86%	5,349	43.88%	885	7.26%
1928	7,103	56.19%	5,358	42.39%	180	1.42%
1932	5,343	38.67%	8,151	58.99%	324	2.34%
1936	6,335	43.15%	8,235	56.09%	113	0.77%
1940	7,768	51.40%	7,255	48.00%	91	0.60%
1944	6,688	53.28%	5,721	45.57%	144	1.15%
1948	5,654	47.49%	5,965	50.10%	286	2.40%
1952	7,118	53.31%	6,078	45.52%	155	1.16%
1956	7,302	55.91%	5,720	43.79%	39	0.30%
1960	7,434	57.92%	5,342	41.62%	58	0.45%
1964	5,412	45.00%	6,528	54.28%	86	0.72%
1968	5,743	50.83%	3,956	35.02%	1,599	14.15%
1972	7,146	65.34%	3,742	34.21%	49	0.45%
1976	5,674	50.37%	5,433	48.23%	158	1.40%
1980	6,980	59.09%	4,363	36.94%	469	3.97%
1984	6,957	64.87%	3,707	34.56%	61	0.57%
1988	5,852	60.77%	3,724	38.67%	53	0.55%
1992	4,696	46.20%	3,306	32.53%	2,162	21.27%
1996	4,858	49.00%	3,605	36.36%	1,452	14.64%
2000	6,393	62.94%	3,605	35.49%	160	1.58%
2004	7,361	68.26%	3,333	30.91%	89	0.83%
2008	6,267	55.00%	4,954	43.48%	174	1.53%
2012	7,096	65.67%	3,460	32.02%	249	2.30%
2016	8,531	75.26%	2,306	20.34%	498	4.39%
2020	9,499	77.35%	2,552	20.78%	230	1.87%
2024	9,354	77.48%	2,495	20.67%	224	1.86%

== Demographics ==
Historical population
Census	Pop.	Note	%±
1830	1,616		—
1840	5,567		244.5%
1850	7,944		42.7%
1860	12,161		53.1%
1870	19,084		56.9%
1880	25,854		35.5%
1890	30,536		18.1%
1900	34,285		12.3%
1910	32,535		−5.1%
1920	29,447		−9.5%
1930	26,479		−10.1%
1940	25,365		−4.2%
1950	23,918		−5.7%
1960	24,207		1.2%
1970	23,933		−1.1%
1980	24,862		3.9%
1990	24,705		−0.6%
2000	26,556		7.5%
2010	26,890		1.3%
2020	26,466		−1.6%
2025 (est.)	26,410	▼	−0.2%
US Decennial Census; 1790-1960 1900-1990; 1990-2000 2010

=== Racial and ethnic composition ===
Clay County, Indiana – Racial and ethnic composition Note: the US Census treats Hispanic/Latino as an ethnic category. This table excludes Latinos from the racial categories and assigns them to a separate category. Hispanics/Latinos may be of any race.
Race / Ethnicity (NH = Non-Hispanic)	Pop 1980	Pop 1990	Pop 2000	Pop 2010	Pop 2020	% 1980	% 1990	% 2000	% 2010	% 2020
White alone (NH)	24,655	24,468	26,038	26,146	24,880	99.17%	99.04%	98.05%	97.23%	94.01%
Black or African American alone (NH)	90	113	86	85	129	0.36%	0.46%	0.32%	0.32%	0.49%
Native American or Alaska Native alone (NH)	19	40	55	57	43	0.08%	0.16%	0.21%	0.21%	0.16%
Asian alone (NH)	23	15	28	60	91	0.09%	0.06%	0.11%	0.22%	0.34%
Native Hawaiian or Pacific Islander alone (NH)	x	x	4	8	6	x	x	0.02%	0.03%	0.02%
Other race alone (NH)	7	3	21	10	47	0.03%	0.01%	0.08%	0.04%	0.18%
Mixed race or Multiracial (NH)	x	x	169	217	810	x	x	0.64%	0.81%	3.06%
Hispanic or Latino (any race)	68	66	155	307	460	0.27%	0.27%	0.58%	1.14%	1.74%
Total	24,862	24,705	26,556	26,890	26,466	100.00%	100.00%	100.00%	100.00%	100.00%

=== 2020 census ===
As of the 2020 census, the county had a population of 26,466. The median age was 41.8 years. 22.7% of residents were under the age of 18 and 19.1% of residents were 65 years of age or older. For every 100 females there were 99.1 males, and for every 100 females age 18 and over there were 97.2 males age 18 and over.

The racial makeup of the county was 94.6% White, 0.5% Black or African American, 0.2% American Indian and Alaska Native, 0.4% Asian, <0.1% Native Hawaiian and Pacific Islander, 0.7% from some other race, and 3.6% from two or more races. Hispanic or Latino residents of any race comprised 1.7% of the population.

40.0% of residents lived in urban areas, while 60.0% lived in rural areas.

There were 10,614 households in the county, of which 29.9% had children under the age of 18 living in them. Of all households, 51.6% were married-couple households, 17.5% were households with a male householder and no spouse or partner present, and 23.4% were households with a female householder and no spouse or partner present. About 26.0% of all households were made up of individuals and 12.3% had someone living alone who was 65 years of age or older.

There were 11,632 housing units, of which 8.8% were vacant. Among occupied housing units, 74.0% were owner-occupied and 26.0% were renter-occupied. The homeowner vacancy rate was 1.3% and the rental vacancy rate was 6.7%.

=== 2010 census ===
As of the 2010 United States census, there were 26,890 people, 10,447 households, and 7,454 families in the county. The population density was 75.2 inhabitants per square mile (29.0/km^{2}). There were 11,703 housing units at an average density of 32.7 per square mile (12.6/km^{2}). The racial makeup of the county was 97.8% white, 0.3% black or African American, 0.2% Asian, 0.2% American Indian, 0.5% from other races, and 0.9% from two or more races. Those of Hispanic or Latino origin made up 1.1% of the population. In terms of ancestry, 29.2% were German, 20.2% were American, 12.8% were Irish, and 11.0% were English.

Of the 10,447 households, 33.4% had children under the age of 18 living with them, 55.9% were married couples living together, 10.7% had a female householder with no husband present, 28.6% were non-families, and 24.0% of all households were made up of individuals. The average household size was 2.54 and the average family size was 2.99. The median age was 39.9 years.

The median income for a household in the county was $47,697 and the median income for a family was $52,907. Males had a median income of $40,671 versus $31,331 for females. The per capita income for the county was $20,569. About 9.0% of families and 12.5% of the population were below the poverty line, including 21.9% of those under age 18 and 6.7% of those age 65 or over.

== See also ==
- National Register of Historic Places listings in Clay County, Indiana
