= Knightsville, Indiana =

- Town
- Location of Knightsville in Clay County, Indiana.
- Coordinates: 39°31′34″N 87°5′27″W
- Country: United States
- State: Indiana
- County: Clay
- Township: Van Buren

Area
  - Total: 1.04 sq mi (2.69 km^{2})
  - Land: 1.04 sq mi (2.69 km^{2})
  - Water: 0 sq mi (0.00 km^{2})
- Elevation: 653 ft (199 m)

Population (2020)
  - Total: 702
  - Density: 676.1/sq mi (261.06/km^{2})
- Time zone: UTC-5 (EST)
  - Summer (DST): UTC-5 (EST)
- ZIP code: 47857
- Area code: 812
- FIPS code: 18-40302
- GNIS feature ID: 0437396

Knightsville is a town in Van Buren Township, Clay County, Indiana, United States. The population was 702 at the 2020 census. It is part of the Terre Haute Metropolitan Statistical Area.

== History ==
Knightsville sprang up in 1867 around an iron furnace which had been built the year before. It was named for Dr. A. W. Knight, the original owner of the town site. The Knightsville post office was established in 1870.

== Geography ==
Knightsville is located at 39°31′34″N 87°5′27″W (39.526209, -87.090828).

According to the 2010 census, Knightsville has a total area of 1.04 square miles (2.69 km^{2}), all land.

== Demographics ==
Historical population
Census	Pop.	Note	%±
1870	1,071		—
1880	958		−10.6%
1890	1,148		19.8%
1900	1,171		2.0%
1910	1,081		−7.7%
1920	767		−29.0%
1930	704		−8.2%
1940	677		−3.8%
1950	678		0.1%
1960	722		6.5%
1970	788		9.1%
1980	763		−3.2%
1990	740		−3.0%
2000	624		−15.7%
2010	872		39.7%
2020	702		−19.5%
U.S. Decennial Census

=== 2010 census ===
As of the census of 2010, there were 872 people, 274 households, and 207 families living in the town. The population density was 838.5 inhabitants per square mile (323.7/km^{2}). There were 303 housing units at an average density of 291.3 per square mile (112.5/km^{2}). The racial makeup of the town was 96.6% White, 1.3% African American, 0.2% Native American, 0.2% Asian, 0.1% Pacific Islander, and 1.6% from two or more races. Hispanic or Latino of any race were 0.7% of the population.

There were 274 households, of which 34.3% had children under the age of 18 living with them, 57.7% were married couples living together, 11.7% had a female householder with no husband present, 6.2% had a male householder with no wife present, and 24.5% were non-families. 20.1% of all households were made up of individuals, and 9.5% had someone living alone who was 65 years of age or older. The average household size was 2.61 and the average family size was 2.95.

The median age in the town was 41.3 years. 20.1% of residents were under the age of 18; 8.2% were between the ages of 18 and 24; 26% were from 25 to 44; 25% were from 45 to 64; and 20.6% were 65 years of age or older. The gender makeup of the town was 50.1% male and 49.9% female.

=== 2000 census ===
As of the census of 2000, there were 624 people, 208 households, and 164 families living in the town. The population density was 611.5 inhabitants per square mile (236.1/km^{2}). There were 232 housing units at an average density of 227.4 per square mile (87.8/km^{2}). The racial makeup of the town was 99.04% White, 0.32% African American, 0.16% Asian, 0.16% from other races, and 0.32% from two or more races. Hispanic or Latino of any race were 0.16% of the population.

There were 208 households, out of which 33.7% had children under the age of 18 living with them, 65.4% were married couples living together, 11.5% had a female householder with no husband present, and 20.7% were non-families. 19.7% of all households were made up of individuals, and 11.1% had someone living alone who was 65 years of age or older. The average household size was 2.61 and the average family size was 2.95.

In the town, the population was spread out, with 21.3% under the age of 18, 6.4% from 18 to 24, 25.0% from 25 to 44, 22.3% from 45 to 64, and 25.0% who were 65 years of age or older. The median age was 44 years. For every 100 females, there were 77.8 males. For every 100 females age 18 and over, there were 75.4 males.

The median income for a household in the town was $38,417, and the median income for a family was $40,481. Males had a median income of $28,750 versus $19,643 for females. The per capita income for the town was $14,123. About 3.5% of families and 5.0% of the population were below the poverty line, including 3.3% of those under age 18 and 15.7% of those age 65 or over.
