= Eaglefield Place =

- U.S. National Register of Historic Places
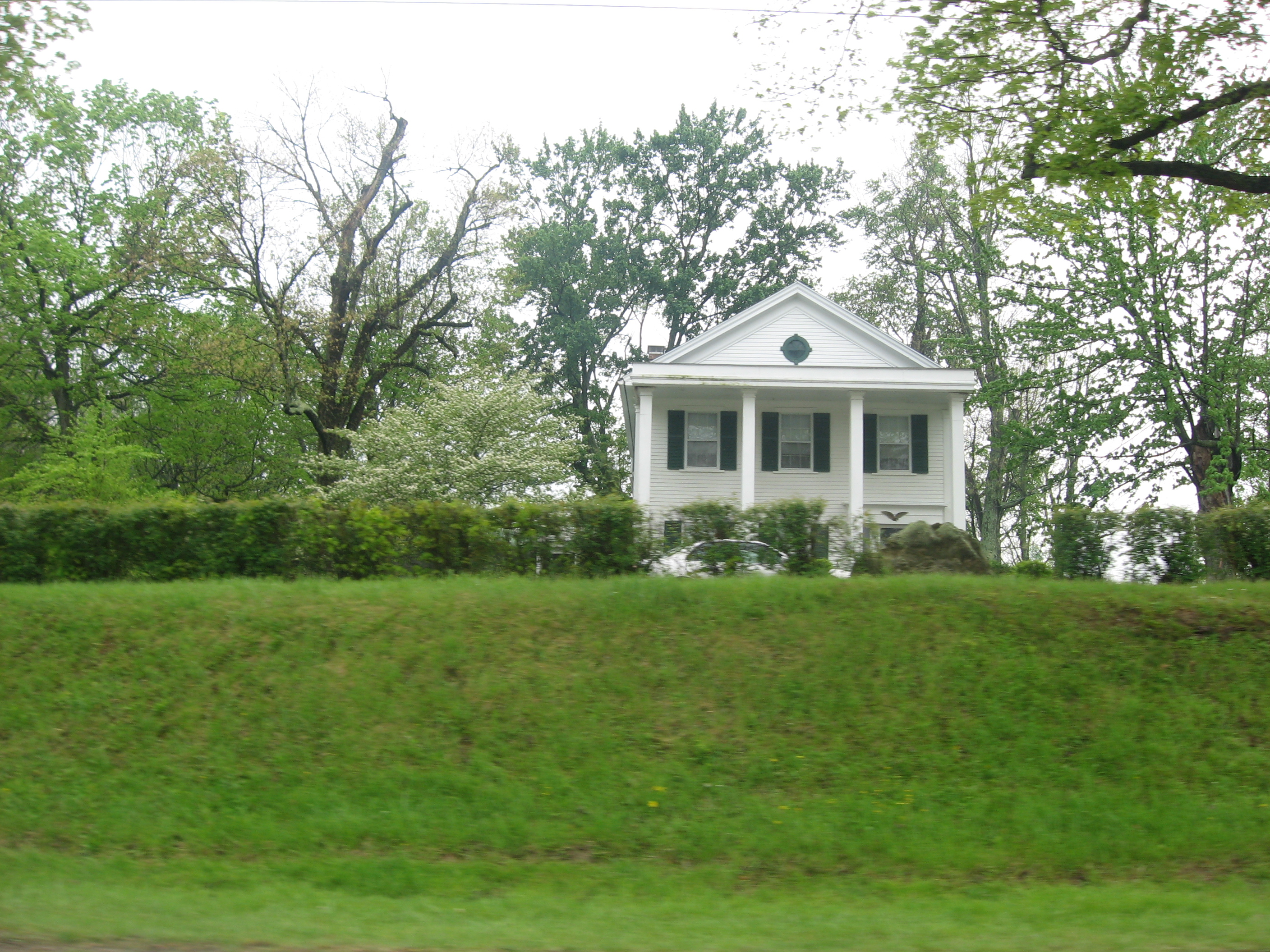
- Eaglefield Place farmhouse, April 2012

- Location within Clay County, Indiana Location within Indiana Location within the United States
- Location: 4870 E. U.S. Route 40, east of Brazil, Van Buren Township, Clay County, Indiana
- Coordinates: 39°32′50″N 87°00′56″W
- Area: 16.8 acres (6.8 ha)
- Built: c. 1855, c. 1895
- Built by: Eaglesfield, William
- Architectural style: Greek Revival, Bungalow/craftsman
- NRHP reference No.: 98001104
- Added to NRHP: August 28, 1998

Eaglefield Place, also known as Eaglesfield-Hunt Farm and Western Eyrie Farm, is a historic home and farm bridge located in Van Buren Township, Clay County, Indiana. The house was built about 1855, and is a two-story, Greek Revival style frame dwelling with a gable roof. Also on the property are a contributing American Craftsman style frame barn (c. 1895), chicken house, and shed.

It was added to the National Register of Historic Places in 1998.
