= Mechanicsburg, Clay County, Indiana =

Unincorporated community in Indiana, U.S.

Coordinates: 39°36′03″N 87°05′15″W

Mechanicsburg was an unincorporated community in Clay County, Indiana, in the United States.

== History ==
The town was laid out in 1871. The founder hoped to attract skilled workers such as mechanics. The town was not successful was already fading by the 1880s; there is no trace of it today.
