= Billtown, Indiana =

Billtown
- Unincorporated community
- Location in Clay County
- Coordinates: 39°30′36″N 87°11′10″W
- Country: United States
- State: Indiana
- County: Clay
- Township: Posey
- Elevation: 623 ft (190 m)
- ZIP code: 47834
- FIPS code: 18-05284
- GNIS feature ID: 431086

Billtown is an unincorporated community in Posey Township, Clay County, Indiana. It is part of the Terre Haute Metropolitan Statistical Area.

== History ==
Billtown was originally known as Williamstown, and under the latter name was platted in 1831.

Billtown once contained a post office under the name Van Buren. The Van Buren post office operated from 1835 until 1865.

== Geography ==
Billtown is located at 39°30′36″N 87°11′10″W.

== Demographics ==
The United States Census Bureau delineated Billtown as a census designated place in the 2022 American Community Survey.
