= Indiana State Road 340 =

State highway in Indiana, United States

State Road 340
- National Road
- SR 340 highlighted in red

Route information
- Maintained by INDOT
- Length: 5.506 mi (8.861 km)

Major junctions
- West end: US 40 at Cloverland
- East end: US 40 at Brazil

Location
- Country: United States
- State: Indiana
- Counties: Clay

Highway system
- Indiana State Highway System; Interstate; US; State; Scenic
← SR 337	→ SR 341

State Road 340 (SR 340) is a State Road in the west-central part of the U.S. state of Indiana. Running for just over 5.5 miles (8.9 km) in a general east–west direction and completely with in Clay County, along the Historic National Road. Both ends of SR 340 are at intersections with U.S. Highway 40 (US 40), with the western end in Cloverland and the eastern end in Brazil. SR 340 was originally introduced in the late 1930s or early 1940s routed north of its modern routing. The road was moved to its modern routing in the 1960s.

== Route description ==
SR 340 begins an intersection with US 40 in the unincorporated community of Cloverland. The road heads east concurrent with the National Road, passing through Cloverland and Billtown, before entering the town of Brazil. In Brazil SR 340 ends at an intersection with US 40 and the National Road continues east on US 40. The entire route of SR 340 is along the old National Road and closely parallels US 40 to the north. The highest traffic count for SR 340 in 2016 was west of its intersection with Waterworks Road in Brazil, where 3,684 vehicles travel the highway on average each day. The lowest traffic count during 2016 was at the western end of SR 340, where 1,379 vehicles travel the highway on average each day.

== History ==
SR 340 was first commissioned in the state of Indiana between 1939 and 1941, running between Cloverland and Brazil. This route was north of the modern routing and north of Williamstown, now Billtown. Between 1962 and 1963 the US 40 designation was moved to a new four-lane highway, between Cloverland and Brazil, and the SR 340 designation was moved south to its modern route, to replace the US 40 designation on the National Road.

== Major intersections ==
The entire route is in Clay County.

Location	mi	km	Destinations	Notes
Cloverland	0.000	0.000	US 40 west / Historic National Road west	Western terminus of SR 340; western end of Historic National Road overlap
Brazil	5.506	8.861	US 40 east / Historic National Road east	Eastern terminus of SR 340; eastern end of Historic National Road overlap
1.000 mi = 1.609 km; 1.000 km = 0.621 mi: Concurrency terminus
