= Ayọ Tometi =

American human rights activist

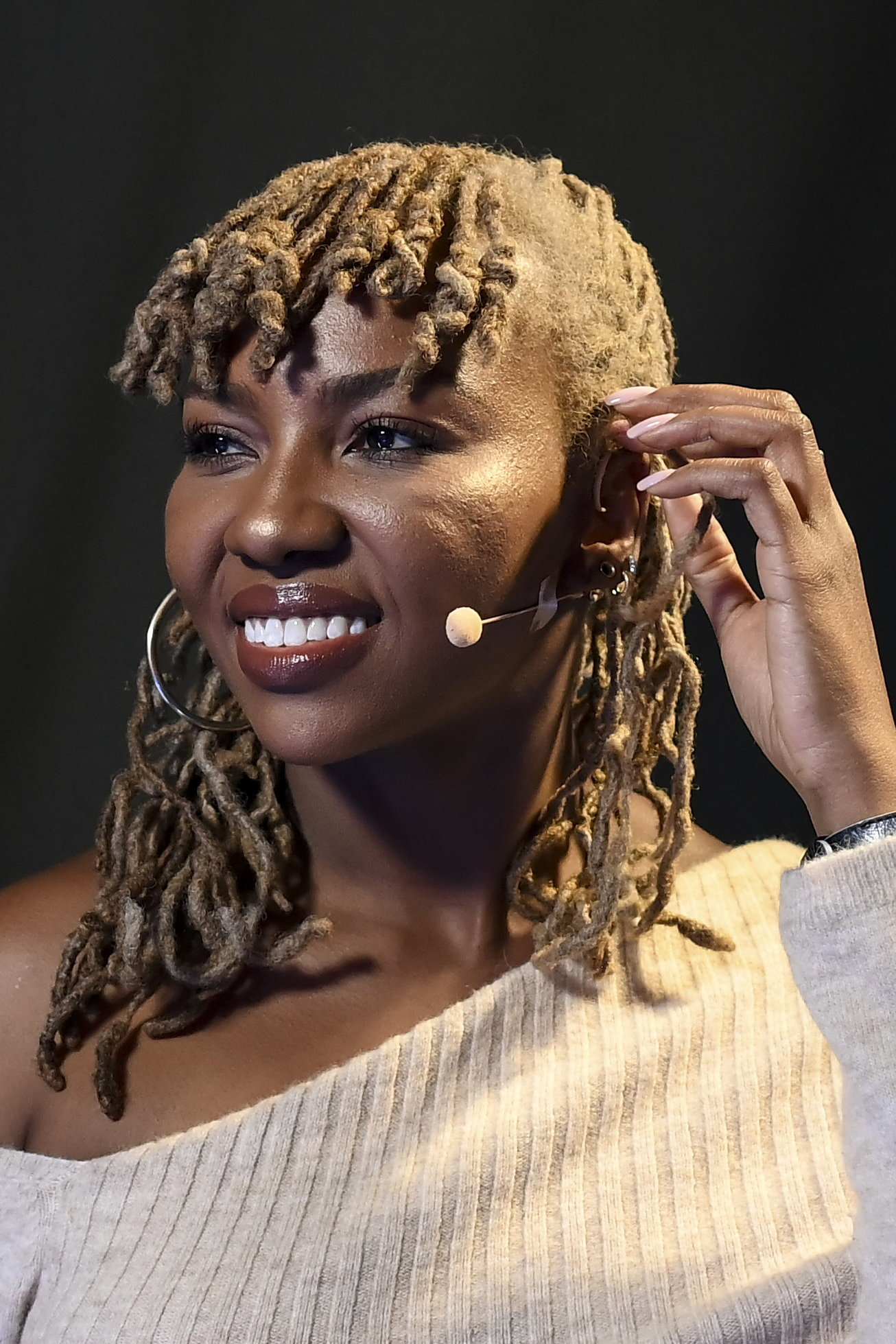
- Born: August 15, 1984 (age 42)
- Education: University of Arizona (BA); Arizona State University (MA)
- Occupations: Activist, writer
- Known for: Black Lives Matter, Black Alliance for Just Immigration
- Website: www.opaltometi.org

Ayọ Tometi (born August 15, 1984), formerly known as Opal Tometi, is an American human rights activist, writer, strategist, and community organizer. She is a co-founder of Black Lives Matter (BLM). She is the former executive director of the United States' first national immigrant rights organization for people of African descent, the Black Alliance for Just Immigration (BAJI), working there in various roles for over nine years.

She started as an active community organizer in her hometown advocating for human rights issues. She has campaigned for advancing human rights, migrant rights, and racial justice worldwide. She also worked as a case manager for survivors of domestic violence.

== Early life and education ==
Ayọ Tometi is the daughter of Nigerian immigrants, who hail from the city of Lagos. Her parents are of Yoruba ethnicity and they speak the Yoruba and Esan languages. Her great-great-great-grandfather was born in the country of Togo, and his son, Tometi's great-grandfather was from Cameroon. Tometi's grandfather was born in Cameroon before eventually emigrating to Nigeria. The oldest of three children, Ayọ Tometi has two younger brothers and grew up mostly in the suburbs of Phoenix, Arizona with other children of immigrants. In addition to Yoruba and Esan, Tometi grew up speaking Pidgin English.

Her parents moved from Nigeria to the United States as undocumented immigrants in 1983, the year before Tometi's birth. During her middle school years, they faced deportation and her mother was unable to return to Nigeria for the burial of her father (Tometi's maternal grandfather) because of the ongoing case. Her parents were eventually successful in defeating their deportation case and able to remain in the United States. Other family and friends of Tometi, including her uncle, also battled deportation during her youth. Tometi's parents later opened a church at which her father is a pastor, Phoenix Impact Center in Phoenix, Arizona, that also serves to help new immigrants adjust to life in the United States. Tometi visited Nigeria for the first time when she was 17 years old and credits these experiences with shaping her approach to pro-immigration advocacy work.

She received a Bachelor of Arts degree in public/applied history from the University of Arizona in 2005 and a master's degree in communication studies, with a specialization in advocacy and rhetoric, from Arizona State University in 2010.

On May 7, 2016, she received an honorary doctor of science degree from Clarkson University. Tometi is a former case manager for survivors of domestic violence and still provides community education on the issue.

== Career ==
=== Early activism ===
After her parents won their deportation case, Tometi began demonstrating with the American Civil Liberties Union (ACLU). She worked as a legal observer at the US-Mexico border. While studying at the University of Arizona, Tometi advocated against Arizona SB 1070, one of the strictest anti-immigration bills passed in the history of the United States, with the Alto Arizona campaign. At the Black-Brown Coalition of Arizona, she also previously held a position as the lead architect. In 2010, Tometi also worked as a spokesperson for the Puente Movement, an immigrants rights group in Arizona.

=== Black Lives Matter ===
Tometi, with community organizers, Patrisse Cullors and Alicia Garza, founded Black Lives Matter (BLM) in 2013. Originally, Garza wrote a Facebook post in response to George Zimmerman's acquittal in the murder of Trayvon Martin. In a response to the post, Cullors used #blacklivesmatter for the first time. Then, Tometi contacted Cullors and Garza, interested in buying a website domain by the same name. The three agreed, and Tometi purchased Blacklivesmatter.com, established Facebook, Tumblr, and Twitter pages for the movement. Tometi contacted numerous other activists in the Black community, alerting them of the new plans and inviting them to join by using the hashtag. Tometi is also credited with selecting black and yellow as the organization's colors, in addition to forming BLM's social media platforms and strategy.

After witnessing the unrest in Ferguson, Missouri following Michael Brown's killing, Tometi mobilized 500 community activists for a demonstration she called the "Black Lives Matter Freedom Ride." This event, fueled by social media, ignited a desire to turn Black Lives Matter into a global movement, addressing systemic racism and police brutality. The demonstration consolidated voices and actions, amplifying the movement's message and sparking conversations worldwide.

After Eric Garner was killed, Tometi organized with a campaign called "Safety Beyond Policing in New York." She is a proponent of defunding the police.

=== Black Alliance for Just Immigration ===
From 2011 to 2020, Tometi worked as co- and communications director, prior to becoming the executive director of the Black Alliance for Just Immigration (BAJI), the first national immigrant rights organization for people of African descent. She was working as the executive director of BAJI when she first saw Garza's Facebook post in 2013. In this role, Tometi was responsible for directing staff within the BAJI organizing committees throughout Washington, D.C., Phoenix, Los Angeles, Oakland, New York, as well as committees within the South on various initiatives concerning racial justice and immigrant rights in the United States. Her other contributions included leading organizing efforts for a rally for immigrant justice and the first Congressional briefing on black immigrants in Washington, D.C. After the 2010 Haiti earthquake, many Haitians were displaced and Tometi led BAJI in securing family reunification visas for those affected by the disaster. She also helped start BAJI's partnership with Race Forward's Drop the I-Word campaign.

== Additional work ==
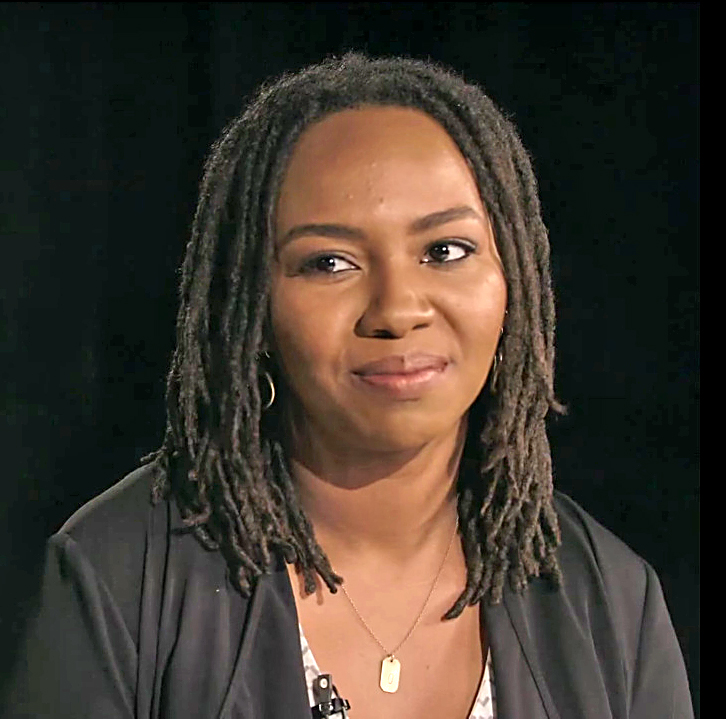
Tometi on The Laura Flanders Show (then on Free Speech TV and teleSUR) in 2015

=== Diaspora Rising ===
In 2020, Tometi created Diaspora Rising, a center focused on cultivating a global Black community, operating mostly on social media.

=== Other projects ===
Tometi also collaborates with the Black Immigration Network and the Pan African Network in Defense of Migrant Rights. She has also been a part of the Global Forum on Migration and Commission on the Status of Women. She serves on the board of directors for the International Living Future Institute and the Atlantic Fellows for Racial Equity.

Tometi has spoken at Susquehanna University, the Facing Race Conference of 2012, the Aspen Institute's Ideas Summit, and the Grinnell College Technology and Human Rights Symposium. She has presented at the United Nations and has participated with the United Nations Global Forum on Migration and the Commission on the Status of Women. While at The University of Arizona, Tometi volunteered with the American Civil Liberties Union. She is additionally involved with Black Organizing for Leadership and Dignity and is a member of Theta Nu Xi sorority. Tometi was invited by the Venezuelan government to be an electoral observer for the parliamentary elections on December 6, 2015. Tometi stated she was "in a place where there is intelligent political discourse" and that the country appears to "have a truly thriving and rigorous democratic system."

Tometi has appeared in several media outlets, including Glamour, Essence, CNN, MSNBC, and BET. Her written works have been published by several media outlets including The Huffington Post and Time. Tometi continues to collaborate with communities in Los Angeles, Phoenix, New York City, Oakland, Washington D.C. and communities throughout the Southern states.

== Personal life ==
As of December 2021, Tometi lives in Brooklyn, New York City. She is gay.

== Recognition and awards ==
- An Essence New Civil Rights Leader (2013)
- With Garza and Cullors, Tometi was named to Time magazine's 100 Women of the Year (2013)
- Cover story of Time Magazine (2013)
- A Los Angeles Times New Civil Rights Leader (2014)
- One of The Root's 100 List of African American Achievers between 25 and 45 (2015)
- With Garza and Cullors, Tometi was named as an awardee of Politico 50's Guide to Thinkers, Doers, and Visionaries (2015)
- With Garza and Cullors, Fortune's List of World's Greatest Leaders (2015)
- Letelier-Moffitt Human Rights Award Recipient (2017)
- The Guardian's 200 Leaders Who Embody the Work of Frederick Douglass (2018)
- With Garza and Cullors, PEN Oakland Josephine Miles Literary Award for When They Call You a Terrorist: A Black Lives Matter Memoir (2019)
- Coretta Scott King Legacy Award Recipient from the Coretta Scott King Center for Cultural and Intellectual Freedom (2019)
- Cover story of The Guardian Nigeria (2020)
- One of Time magazine's 100 Most Influential People (2020)
- One of BBC 's 100 Women (2020)
- With Garza and Cullors, Nobel Peace Prize nominee (2021)
- Featured in National Museum for African American History and Culture (NMAAHC)
- City University of New York scholarship namesake, "Opal Tometi Scholarship" (2017)
- Clarkson University Honorary PhD recipient (2016)
