= Sterling College (Vermont) =

Private work college in Craftsbury, Vermont, US

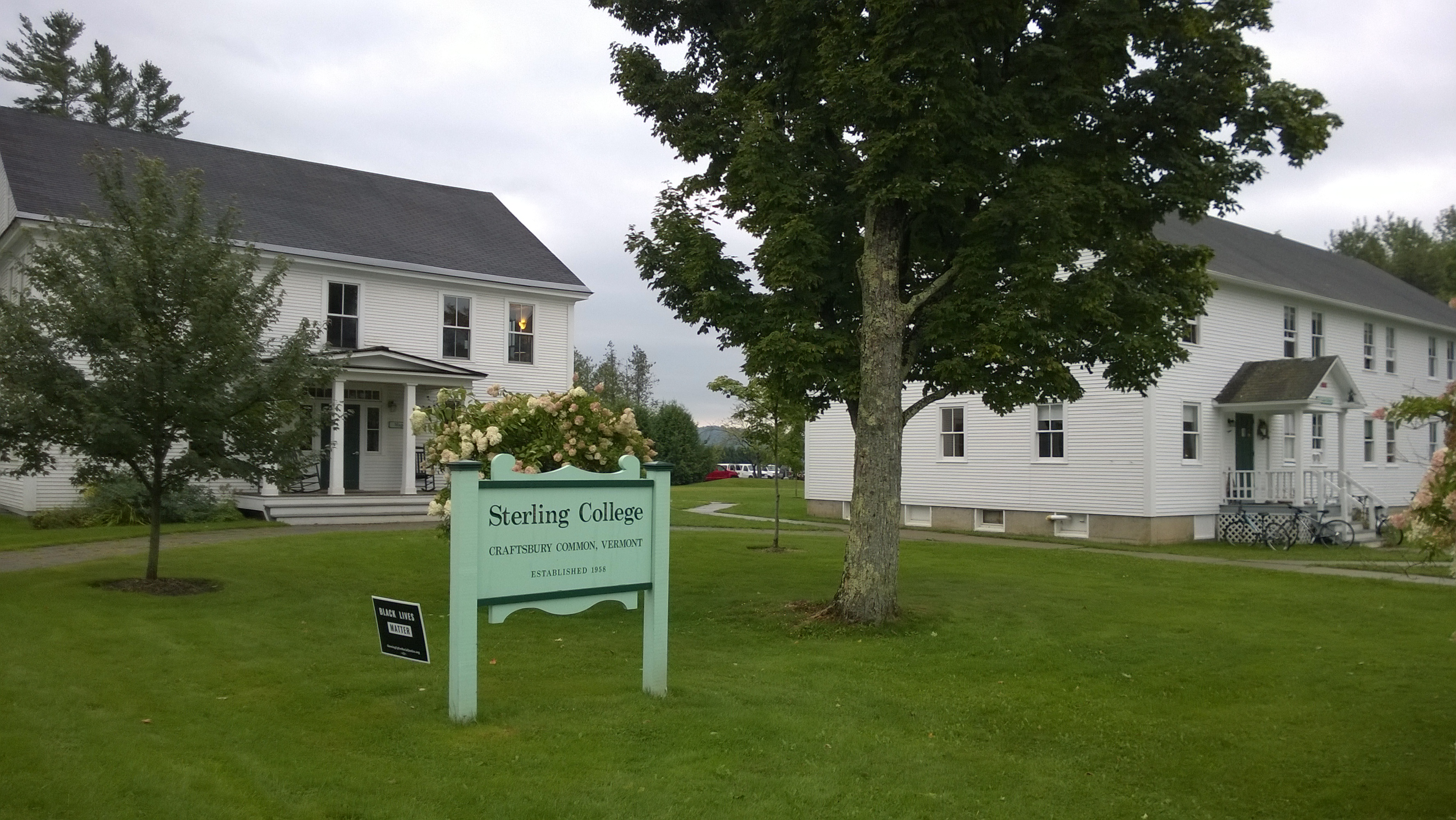
- Former name: Sterling School (1958-1974)
- Motto: Ecological Thinking and Action
- Type: Private work college
- Active: 1958–2026
- Endowment: $1.1 million
- Total staff: about 30 faculty and staff (fall 2025)
- Students: fewer than 40 (fall 2025)
- Location: Craftsbury Common, Vermont, United States; 44.6523°N 72.3823°W
- Campus: Rural
- Website: www.sterlingcollege.edu

Sterling College was a private work college in Craftsbury Common, Vermont. Its degree-granting curriculum was focused on ecological thinking and action through a major in Environmental Studies, with concentrations in Ecology, Environmental Humanities, Outdoor Education, and Sustainable Agriculture & Food Systems. The college was accredited by the New England Commission of Higher Education (NECHE).

Sterling closed in May 2026, citing persistent financial and enrollment challenges.

== History ==
Sterling School was founded as a boys' college preparatory school in 1958. The school's transition to higher education in the 1970s began with the Academic Short Course in Outdoor Leadership, a 21-day program.

=== College (1974–2026) ===
In 1974, Sterling School faced closure, and a small group of faculty launched the educational model that became Sterling College. That year, faculty established an academic-year program similar to Outward Bound programs, known as Grassroots Project in Vermont at Sterling Institute.

By 1983, Sterling had developed into an accredited college offering an Associate of Arts degree in resource management. Full accreditation by the New England Association of Schools and Colleges was granted in 1987.

Since 1997, Sterling College had been accredited as a four-year college. It had awarded Bachelor of Arts degrees in Ecology, Environmental Humanities, Outdoor Education, and Sustainable Agriculture & Food Systems. Sterling College joined the Work Colleges Consortium in 1999.

In 2013, Sterling College announced that it would be the first college in Vermont, and the third college in the United States, to divest its endowment from fossil fuel extractors.

=== Transition and planned conclusion of degree programs ===
On November 12, 2025, Sterling announced that its Board of Trustees had voted to conclude the college's Associate and Bachelor’s degree programs at the end of the Spring 2026 semester. The college said the decision followed a multi-year effort to reverse declining enrollment and address structural budget challenges, and that it could not achieve a stable financial model necessary for continued viability. News coverage described the decision as part of a broader set of closures and transitions affecting small colleges in Vermont and New England. In November 2025, Seven Days reported that fewer than 40 students were studying at Sterling during the fall semester, supported by roughly 30 faculty and staff.

NECHE accepted Sterling’s notification of institutional closure at its November 20–21, 2025 meeting, and accepted the college’s teach-out plan on December 8, 2025. Sterling’s transition materials stated that the college anticipated remaining accredited through Summer 2026 and would provide advising for students completing degrees at Sterling or transferring to other institutions. The college scheduled its final commencement ceremony for May 16, 2026, with summer internships for credit available if needed. Since May 31, 2026, the College of the Atlantic has served as custodian of student records.

The future of Sterling’s campus and remaining assets remained under review during the transition. In April 2026, The Hardwick Gazette reported that Sterling and Headwaters Community Trust were discussing a possible path forward for the Craftsbury campus, including a draft offer from Headwaters and ongoing negotiations. Sterling’s Board of Trustees later said discussions with Headwaters focused on a potential sale of the Craftsbury campus, while the Bear Swamp property in Wolcott would be addressed separately.

=== Presidents ===
- William Manning (1985)
- Jed Williamson (1996–2006)
- Will Wootton (2006–2012)
- Matthew Derr (2012–2021)
- Lori Collins-Hall (2021–2023; interim)
- Scott L. Thomas (2023–present)

== Academics ==
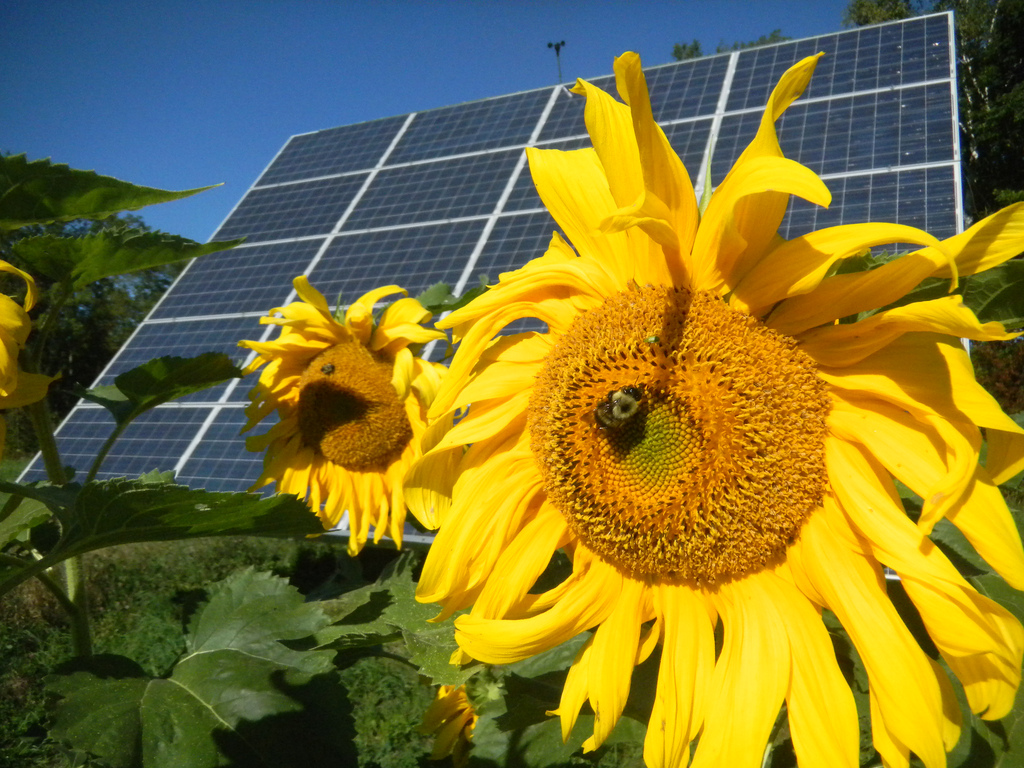
A solar panel at Sterling College

Through the 2025–2026 academic year, Sterling College offered associate and bachelor's degrees. Its degree-granting curriculum was centered on Environmental Studies, with concentrations in Ecology, Environmental Humanities, Outdoor Education, and Sustainable Agriculture & Food Systems. The college was the first in the United States to offer a minor in Draft Horse Management.

In 2013, Sterling College created the Rian Fried Center for Sustainable Agriculture and Food Systems. Named for the late trustee, it became the center point for the college's focus on sustainable agriculture and sustainable food systems.

Sterling College also launched a continuing education program in 2013, with a series of two- and four-week short courses. The first course offered was a two-week cheese-making intensive in partnership with the Cellars at Jasper Hill. Other courses in 2014 featured guest faculty such as Sandor Katz, Rowan Jacobsen, Ginger Strand, and Clare Walker Leslie.

As part of the teach-out process announced in 2025, students on track to graduate in May 2026 were to receive individual advising. Sterling said that summer internships for credit would be available through August 2026 if needed.

== Campus ==
The primary campus was 130 acres (53 ha) in Craftsbury Common. It had 14 buildings, including a woodworking shop and a library. Outdoor teaching facilities included a managed woodlot, a challenge course, a 30 feet (9.1 m) climbing tower, managed gardens, and a working livestock farm with two solar-powered barns.

Much of what had been grown and raised on campus had been used in the dining hall. In 2017, Vermont Farm to Plate reported that Sterling produced approximately 35% of its own food, with an overall 53% coming from within a 150-mile radius of the college.

As part of Sterling’s 2025–2026 transition, the future of the Craftsbury campus and other college assets came under review. In April 2026, The Hardwick Gazette reported that Headwaters Community Trust and Sterling were discussing a possible acquisition of the campus, while Sterling’s president said exploration of a potential sale was ongoing. Sterling’s Board of Trustees said later that month that discussions with Headwaters were focused on a possible sale of the Craftsbury campus, while the Bear Swamp property in Wolcott would be handled separately.
