= Joan Straumanis =

Academic administrator, philosopher, second-wave feminist

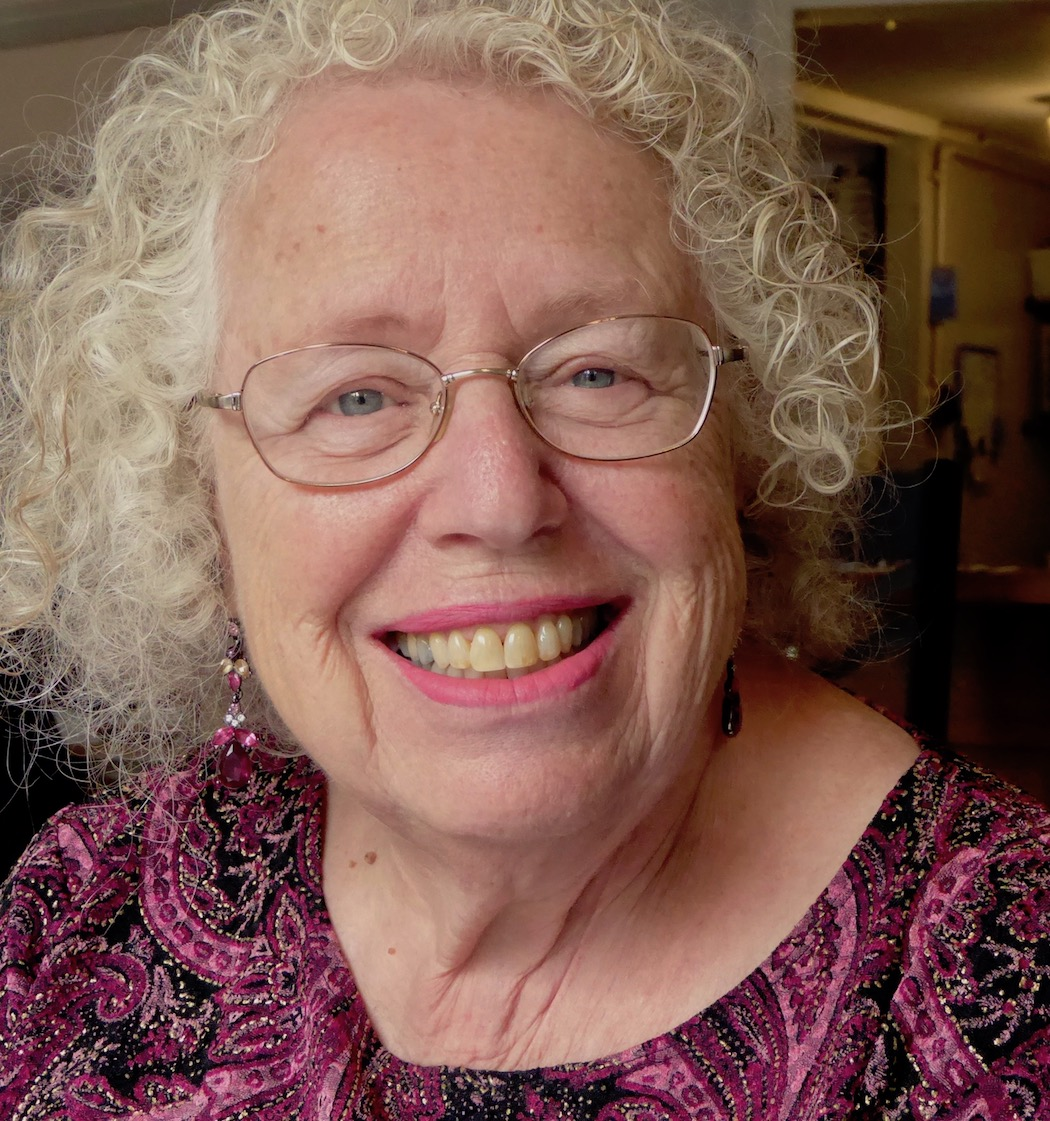
- Straumanis in 2017

4th President of Metropolitan College of New York
- In office 2007–2008
- Preceded by: Stephen A. Greenwald
- Succeeded by: Vinton Thompson

20th President of Antioch College
- In office 2002–2004
- Preceded by: Robert Devine
- Succeeded by: Steven Lawry

Personal details
- Born: Joan Elaine Cole; February 10, 1937 (age 89) New York City, US
- Education: Antioch College (mathematics, political science), University of Maryland (philosophy)

Joan Straumanis (/strəˈmɑːnɪs/ born 1937) is an academic administrator, philosopher, second-wave feminist, mathematician, civil libertarian, public speaker, and American pioneer in women's studies. She co-created the first women's studies program outside a public university, and served as president of both Antioch College and the Metropolitan College of New York and as academic dean at other institutions.

== Early life and education ==
Straumanis was born in New York City. She lived most of her childhood in Parkchester, a 12,000 unit post-war housing development in the Bronx. She was the oldest child of second-generation immigrants, whose parents left eastern Europe in the early twentieth century. Her father, Herbert S. Cole, was raised in a Jewish orphanage in New York and became the first in his family to attend college. Her mother, Mollie Brandt Cole, attended college only after a long career in insurance administration. As a young child, Joan was given freedom to travel by subway and visit museums alone, allowing her to develop personal independence and wide interests.

Straumanis is a graduate of Bronx High School of Science (1953) and of Antioch College (1957). After attaining the equivalent of a master's degree in mathematics based on graduate studies at the University of Colorado and Ohio State University, she completed a PhD in the philosophy department at the University of Maryland (1971).

== Academic career summary ==
Straumanis taught in secondary education and higher education, and worked in two U.S. government agencies administering grant programs: the Department of Education and the National Science Foundation. She served as a leader and administrator at five US colleges: Kenyon College (Academic Dean/Associate Provost), Rollins College (Dean of the Faculty), Lehigh University (Arts and Sciences Dean), Antioch College (President), and Metropolitan College of New York (President). She was the first woman to hold a senior administration position at Kenyon College as well as the first woman to hold the rank of full professor there. She was the first female president of Antioch College and the first woman to be a dean at any college within Lehigh University.

Straumanis taught mathematics to high school students before earning a PhD in philosophy, afterwards teaching philosophy at the college level. At various institutions, Straumanis taught ethics, logic, women's studies, philosophy of science, philosophy of the social sciences, history of science, and philosophy of language, among other classes.

Throughout her career, she supported academic innovation including with service on these boards: Ohio Foundation for Independent Colleges, INTART Foundation (promoting contemporary Russian art), Museo Fondo Del Sol, SMART Discovery Center science museum, Orlando Science Center, and Northwest Area Foundation. Straumanis has also served on numerous accreditation boards, institutional review boards, academic commissions and task forces.

== Institutional transition leadership ==
=== Antioch College ===
During her two-and-a-half-year contract as president of Antioch College (2002–2004), Straumanis rebuilt community trust with the staff unions, completing the first contract revision negotiation in thirty years. She oversaw a Renewal Commission, chartered by the board of trustees, and the Committee of 150, a broad volunteer effort by top professionals in higher education in honor of the college's sesquicentennial year. She brought in Antioch as a founding member of the Eco League multi-college environmental consortium of "green" colleges. During her presidency, she also launched a capital campaign and helped initiate curricular reform and budget stabilization plans.

=== Metropolitan College of New York ===
The Registry for Retired College and University presidents connected Straumanis to a one-year contract as president of the Metropolitan College of New York (academic year 2007–2008). Straumanis reversed impending plans for sale of the college to a for-profit institution, recommitted the college to its founding vision of service work combined with academics, and rebuilt enrollment as well as the administration and the board of trustees. Her "savvy, down-to-earth leadership style brought the college back from the brink."

Straumanis's comments upon being hired indicate her approach to complex situations:

“It’s exciting,” she said of her new post at the college. “It’s going to be challenging, and it’s going to be an adventure.”

=== Kenyon College ===
As a feminist and education innovator, Straumanis brought some controversial ideas when she moved to Kenyon College as associate provost. Most important was the concept that women's studies should be taught as part of a liberal arts education, and within her first year (1983–1984) she had recruited a team to create a class.

She also held that a liberal arts education should incorporate computers, tools that were part of "the best of our age" that should be incorporated more thoroughly in education. Academic computing was just emerging in the U.S., but she made sure Kenyon was at the leading edge.

Straumanis also spearheaded a five-year double degree in teacher education, a school-college articulation program for gifted high school students, a student-teacher education program called 5-STEP, an International Studies interdisciplinary major, and a Summer Science Scholars program.

=== Denison University ===
Immediately after graduate school, Straumanis was hired as a philosopher by Denison University, a liberal arts college in Granville, Ohio. Her early leadership in establishing women's studies as a discipline required a thorough shake-up of the dominant paradigm at the university. Her activism was not without consequence. In 1975 Denison denied Straumanis and three other female faculty members tenure. One stated reason for the denial was her involvement in women's studies. An uprising by the growing women's movement at Denison forced the institution to reconsider and grant Straumanis tenure. Later, while chair of the Philosophy Department, Straumanis also served on the search committee which in 1976 hired Dr. Robert C. Good, who had been the first U.S. ambassador to Zambia, as president of Denison.

== Women's studies ==
=== Starting a program at Denison University ===
In 1972, Straumanis co-created a women's studies program at Denison University with feminist organizer Ann Fitzgerald and student Peggy Gifford. It was the earliest women's studies program offered at a private college and followed closely on the heels of the trail-blazing programs at UCSD and SUNY Buffalo, both in 1971.

…in 1978, Denison became the first co-ed college in the country to institute a graduation requirement for either a Black studies or women's studies course. In 1981, Denison established a women's studies minor. And in 1983, a women's studies major.

The program grew into a collaboration with many other faculty including Nan Nowik, John Schilb, Robin Bartlett and Julie Mulroy. The program was immediately popular, starting its second semester with 120 students, eleven of them men. In 1973, it was not possible to get a graduate degree in women's studies, so the faculty resisted requests to approve formal classes. Rather than create a normal, graded credit course, they undertook a pass/fail interdisciplinary seminar without grades and incorporating student leadership. This allowed for curricular freedom without encroaching on any department's turf.

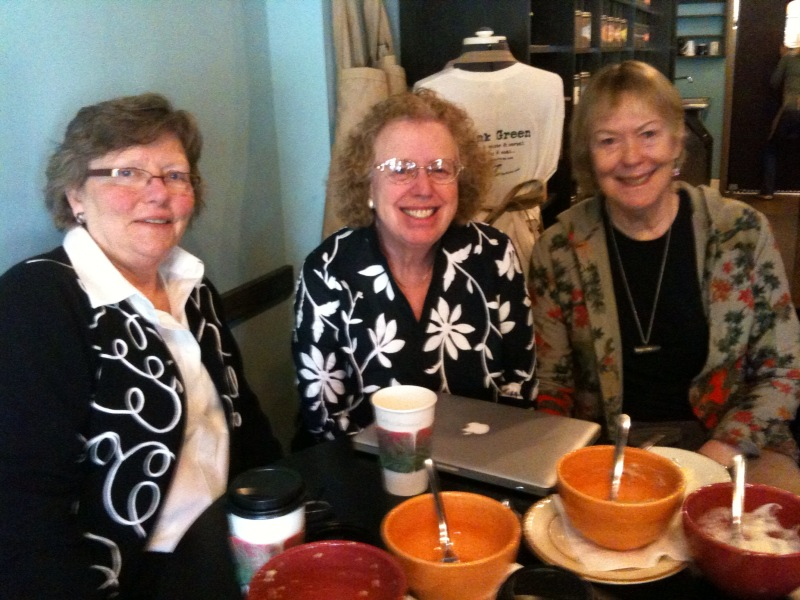
Robin L. Bartlett, Denison University Economics Professor with Joan Straumanis and Ann Fitzgerald, at a reunion of the founders of the Denison University women's studies program, held January, 2010 in St Petersburg, FL.

In a 1984 retrospective interview after leaving Denison, Straumanis highlighted what was most remarkable, in her view, about the program:

There are two main things that made Women's Studies and the Women's Movement at Denison special in my view, and I see this, now, as an outsider. One was that there was a great deal of emphasis on collective leadership. You might hear different things from different people, but I know that we always felt that it was very important that people would learn new skills and that leadership would pass from person to person, that the Women's Coordinator job would pass from person to person, that new people would be involved in teaching Women's Studies every year, that it would get out into the departments and that it wasn't a fixed group of people that held power and who did the teaching. We had a faculty development model in which team teaching was the means of training the next generation of Women's Studies faculty. That's one very important feature that is unusual if not unique. And the other thing which ought to be more common, but I think was unusual, was the strong alliance with Black Studies.

One assignment given the students was to choose a paper or presentation assigned in some other class and focus it on a feminist who played a role in the assigned topic. This created awareness among both faculty and students in every department: The mostly male faculty members were faced with the existence of important people in their fields that they had never heard about. The cumulative result of these assignments was a greater receptivity to women's studies among both faculty and students.

Soon, Denison's women's studies classes became formally recognized, standard credit classes. The work of the early women's studies program students resulted in a grassroots demand that Denison not only allow formal classes in women's studies, but also institute a graduation requirement. This new rule was enacted by the Faculty Senate stating that every student must complete a class in women's studies or Black studies.

Each semester's women's studies course would end in a party with a parody responding to a common accusation "of having a one-sided course—that we never gave the other side." Straumanis reminisced in 1984 about those parody final classes in the 1970s:

Of course, we would say "But that's like talking about the other side of racism or the Holocaust." But if these people were really serious about hearing "the other side" there were all these other courses in the university and the world they lived in that were presenting "the other side" all the time! But we would make this one concession by teaching "the other side" on one day. … So no one could claim that we never gave attention to "the other side." In fact, we always gave "the other side" the last word.

=== Defining women's studies ===
In a 1986 Interview at Rollins College, Straumanis explained her commitment to a broad definition of women's studies:

Women's studies is not a discipline. It is an interdisciplinary study not just of women, but the whole issue of gender as an explanatory principle. I think that is the most important thing to say about women's studies, because women's studies does consider men, and it considers all of the aspects of gender that have been omitted from psychology, history, anthropology, literature, art, philosophy and so on. It doesn't just look at the contributions of women, but looks at what difference gender makes.

Straumanis was awarded the inaugural (first annual) Faculty Leadership Award, Crossed Keys Honorary in 1981 at Denison University. She was instrumental in the founding of the Great Lakes Colleges Association's Women's Studies Consortium and the Society for Women in Philosophy.

== Federal grants administration ==
Straumanis served as a program director at two U.S. Federal agencies in offices devoted to supporting higher education. In the Department of Education she worked from 1992 to 1995 and 1998 to 2002 at the Fund for the Improvement of Postsecondary Education (FIPSE). At the National Science Foundation from 2008 to 2010 she managed basic research on neuroscience and learning at the Research Directorate for Social, Behavioral and Economic Sciences (SBE). In her SBE work, she guided innovative projects developing culturally grounded learning models for Native American Communities, as well as other work on Native American partnerships.

At the National Academy of Engineering Straumanis also played an independent advisory role on matters involving engineering and technology from 2000 to 2002.

=== Grant resource ===
Her 1992 FIPSE guide, "Funding Your Best Ideas: A 12 Step Program," became a standard grant-seeker reference used in many institutions. It is still in use well beyond her employment at the Department of Education.

== Political activities ==
=== American Civil Liberties Union ===
Straumanis served as a board member in five chapters of the American Civil Liberties Union in Virginia, Pennsylvania and Florida.

=== Ohio rape counseling law ===
Students from Straumanis's 1974 Legal Rights of Women course examined rape law in Ohio after a rape on the Denison University campus. Straumanis was herself arrested (but never prosecuted) for failure to report a felony. Her announcement to the community of the fact that a rape had occurred precipitated this arrest, after she had been approached confidentially by the student who was raped. The students, continuing the effort long after class had ended, proposed legislation to decriminalize confidentiality maintained by de facto counselors such as professors and advisors. In 1976, the legislation covering sexual assault and rape counseling, even by nonprofessional counselors, was signed into Ohio law.

== Personal life ==
While at Antioch she married chemist Irwin Pomerantz, from whom she is divorced. While at the University of Maryland she married philosopher and educator Eric Straumanis, who is deceased. She has three children and four grandchildren.
