= Matthew Derr =

American educator (born 1967)

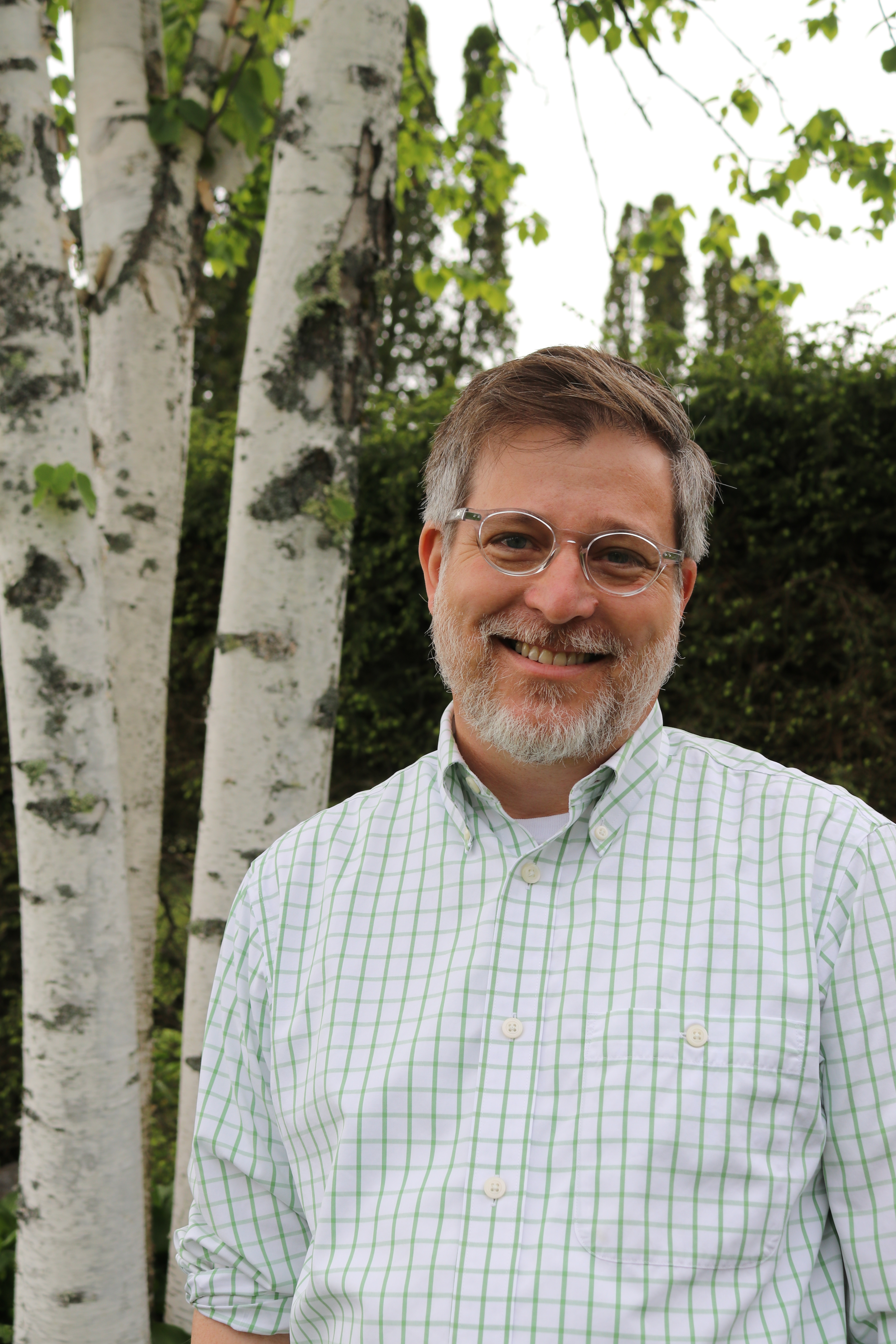
- Derr in 2018

11th President of Sterling College
- In office 2012–2021
- Preceded by: Will Wootton
- Succeeded by: Lori Collins-Hall

President of Antioch College
- In office 2007–2010
- Preceded by: Steven Lawry
- Succeeded by: Mark Roosevelt

Personal details
- Born: July 12, 1967 (age 59) Flint, Michigan
- Education: Antioch College, University of Michigan, New York University
- Profession: Academic

Matthew Derr (born July 12, 1967) is an American educator. He presently serves as Deputy Publisher at Chelsea Green Publishing, an imprint of Rizzoli International, and was a trustee and executive director of the company's philanthropic foundation.

From 2007 to 2010 he served as interim president of Antioch College in Ohio and from 2012 to 2021 as President of Sterling College in Vermont.

== Early life and education ==
Derr was born on July 12, 1967, in Flint, Michigan. His grandparents and parents were autoworkers. He attended public schools before earning a Bachelor of Arts in History from Antioch College in 1989 and Masters of Social Work in Community Organizing and Social Systems from the University of Michigan in 2012. He has also studied at the George Heyman Center for Philanthropy at New York University.

== Career ==
=== Interim President of Antioch College (2007–2010) ===
After the closure of his alma mater Antioch College in 2007, Derr led an alumni drive to reopen the institution and raised $25 million. He served as interim president of Antioch from 2007 to 2010.

In 2010, the Council for Advancement and Support of Education awarded Derr with the organization's Chief Executive Leadership Award for his efforts "in saving Antioch College from permanent closure." The Great Lakes Colleges Association recognized his efforts on behalf of liberal education with a visiting fellowship.

=== President of Sterling College (2012–2021) ===
Derr was hired as president of Sterling College in Vermont in 2012. During his nearly decade long tenure the college achieved record enrollment and fundraising success.

Under his leadership, Sterling expanded its emphasis on global field studies. In 2015, it created a continuing education program named the School of the New American Farmstead. In 2016, with support from the Endeavor Foundation, the college launched the Rian Fried Center for Sustainable Agriculture & Food Systems.
