= Mark Roosevelt =

American academic administrator (born 1955)

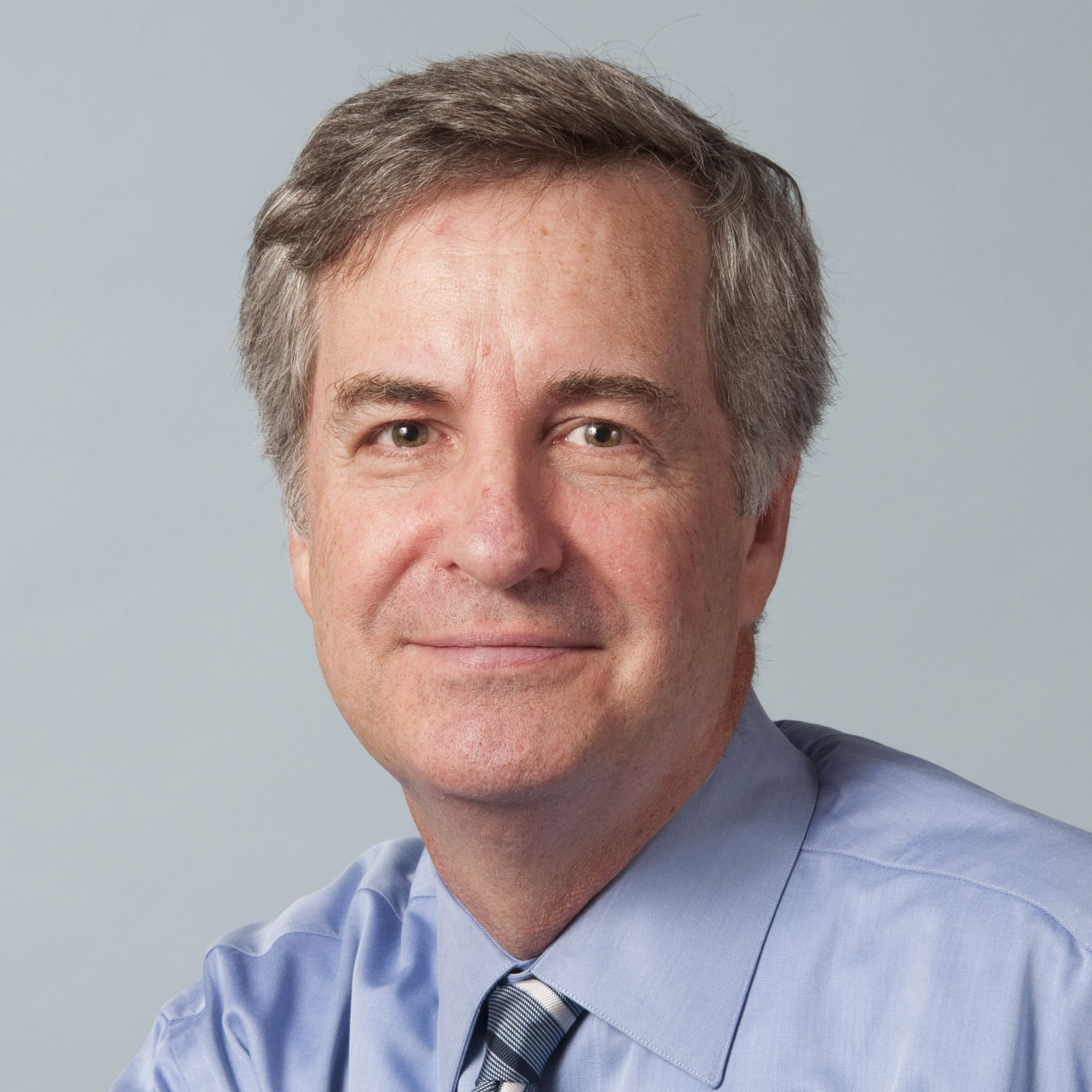
- Roosevelt in 2011

7th President of St. John's College–Santa Fe
- In office July 1, 2016 – June 2024
- Preceded by: Michael P. Peters
- Succeeded by: J. Walter Sterling

President of Antioch College
- In office January 2011 – December 2015
- Preceded by: Matthew Derr (Acting)
- Succeeded by: Tom Manley

Member of the Massachusetts House of Representatives from the 8th Suffolk district
- In office 1985–1995
- Preceded by: Thomas J. Vallely
- Succeeded by: Paul C. Demakis

Personal details
- Born: December 10, 1955 (age 70) Washington, D.C., U.S.
- Party: Democratic
- Relations: Roosevelt family
- Parent: Kermit Roosevelt Jr. (father)
- Education: Harvard University (BA, JD)

Mark Roosevelt (born December 10, 1955) is an American academic administrator and politician who served as the seventh president of the Santa Fe campus of St. John's College. He was the President of Antioch College from January 2011 to December 2015 and superintendent of the Pittsburgh Public Schools, the second largest school district in Pennsylvania, until December 31, 2010. He served as a state legislator in the Massachusetts House of Representatives and was the Democratic nominee for governor in the 1994 Massachusetts gubernatorial election. Roosevelt is the great-grandson of Theodore Roosevelt, and the son of CIA agent Kermit Roosevelt Jr.

== Early life and education ==
Roosevelt was born and raised in Washington, D.C. and attended St. Albans School. Roosevelt is the great-grandson of U.S. President Theodore Roosevelt and the son of Mary Lowe "Polly" (née Gaddis) and Kermit Roosevelt Jr., who was one of the key figures behind the controversial coup engineered by the CIA that overthrew Iranian Prime Minister Mohammad Mossadegh in 1953. He was related to his 1994 Massachusetts gubernatorial opponent William Weld through Weld's wife at that time, Susan Roosevelt Weld, the daughter of Quentin Roosevelt II; Susan is Mark's second cousin.

He earned a Bachelor of Arts degree in history from Harvard University and a Juris Doctor from Harvard Law School.

== Career ==
=== Political career ===
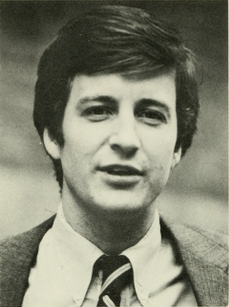
Roosevelt as a State Representative in 1987

In 1977, Roosevelt served as campaign manager for John D. O'Bryant, the first black man elected to the Boston School Committee.

Roosevelt served in the Massachusetts General Court from 1986 to 1994. In 1990, he was appointed Chairman of the legislature's Education Committee, where he was the co-author and chief sponsor of the Massachusetts Education Reform Act of 1993. He also was chief sponsor of a gay rights bill that had been introduced annually since 1972 but did not pass until 1989. The bill's passage made Massachusetts the second state, after Wisconsin, to pass legislation protecting gay rights.

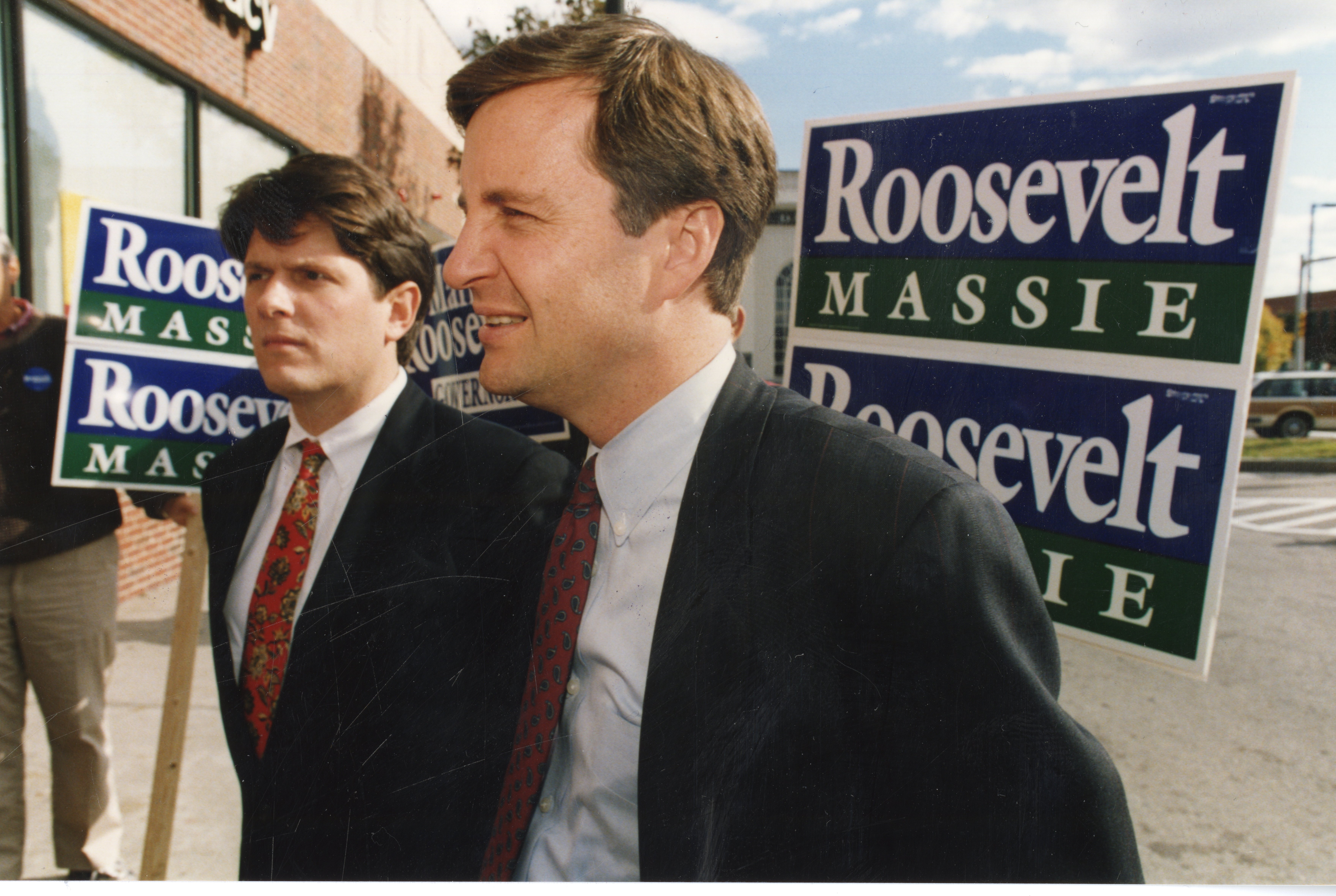
Roosevelt (right) campaigns for governor in 1994 with his running-mate Bob Massie in Danvers

In 1994, Roosevelt was the Democratic nominee for Governor of Massachusetts and lost the general election to the Republican incumbent, William Weld. Roosevelt and Weld were second cousins by marriage, as Weld's first wife, Susan Roosevelt Weld, is also a great-grandchild of President Theodore Roosevelt.

Following his bid for office, Roosevelt served as CEO of Massachusetts Biomedical Initiatives, Managing Director of the Massachusetts Business Alliance for Education, and as a Professor of Politics and head of the Gordon Public Policy Center at Brandeis University.

=== Pittsburgh Public Schools ===
A graduate of the 2003 Broad Superintendents Academy, Roosevelt was appointed on August 3, 2005, to the position of Pittsburgh Public Schools (PPS) superintendent. He accepted this post under the terms of a performance-based "accountability contract." While in Pittsburgh, he implemented measures intended to ease the district's financial problems and improve academic standards. The plan included the closing of underutilized and under-performing schools, opening of accelerated learning academies with a vigorous academic curriculum and longer school hours, the moving of several programs, and an increase in the number of childhood education programs, K-8 schools and 6-12 schools.

Under his leadership, PPS met federal achievement standards (AYP) for the first time, received a $40-million grant from the Bill and Melinda Gates Foundation focused on improving teacher effectiveness, opened several innovative new schools, adopted a more rigorous curriculum, and inaugurated a nationally recognized program to recruit, train and support school principals as instructional leaders.

In October 2010 he became a finalist for the position of President of Antioch College. On October 6, 2010, he held a press conference to announce his resignation as superintendent of Pittsburgh Public Schools effective December 31, 2010. It was reported that he was the only finalist for the Presidency of Antioch College in Ohio.

=== Antioch College ===
Roosevelt served as president of Antioch College from 2011 to 2015. Hired to reestablish the college, which had closed, Roosevelt helped to recruit faculty and students, began a renovation of the campus; and reestablished Antioch's cooperative education program. He also led a process that resulted in "fast-track" accreditation consideration for Antioch from the Higher Learning Commission. The college won accreditation in July 2016. He negotiated an agreement between the College and Antioch University that eliminated any future claims of the university to Antioch College's campus or endowment.

On May 5, 2015, Roosevelt announced his departure from Antioch by the end of the year. Dr. Thomas Manley was hired as his successor, to begin in March 2016.

=== St. John's College ===
Mark Roosevelt was the seventh president of the Santa Fe campus of St. John's College, which also has a campus in Annapolis, Maryland, replacing Michael P. Peters. He took office on January 1, 2016. In June of that year, the St. John's Board of Visitors and Governors voted to make Roosevelt the college-wide president as of July 1, 2016. During his tenure as president of St. John's, Mark Roosevelt was allegedly involved in a union-busting campaign against student workers.

=== Other work ===
Roosevelt has also taught graduate level courses on the intersection of American history and public policy at Brandeis University and the Heinz Graduate School of Public Policy at Carnegie Mellon University.

== Family ==
He is married to Dorothy, the former project lead of Antioch College's Wellness Center, which opened to the public on September 6, 2014. Prior to Antioch College, Dorothy worked at Project Zero at the Harvard Graduate School of Education and as a yoga instructor. They married in January 2005 and have a daughter, Juliana. Mark Roosevelt also has an adopted son, Matthew, born in South Korea and raised in Boston, from a previous marriage.

Party political offices
Preceded by John Silber	Democratic nominee for Governor of Massachusetts; 1994	Succeeded by Scott Harshbarger
Academic offices
Preceded by Matthew Derr; Acting	President of Antioch College; 2011–2015	Succeeded by Tom Manley
