= Nonstop Liberal Arts Institute =

The Nonstop Liberal Arts Institute was the educational program supported by Nonstop Antioch, a movement organized by alumni and former students, staff and faculty of Antioch College to keep Antioch College alive and operating in Yellow Springs, Ohio. Nonstop was supported for one year by the Antioch College Alumni Association through the College Revival Fund. Originally organized in 2007 shortly after Antioch University announced the closure of the original college and campus, the effort was first known as "Antioch-College-in-Exile" but changed its name after the university threatened a lawsuit over use of the Antioch name or other identifiers. The Nonstop effort was not supported by or affiliated with the Antioch University system.

It was described in 2008 as reimagining "education for the twenty-first century as progressive liberal arts for life." The curriculum of the Institute was distinctive in its historically unprecedented level of integration into, and collaboration with, the surrounding community." Nonstop was founded as a college without a campus, inhabiting churches, coffee shops and homes around the village of Yellow Springs and served local residents as well as traditionally aged students.

On July 18, 2008, the Trustees of Antioch University reached a preliminary agreement with the Antioch College Alumni Association. The preliminary agreement created a framework to "address issues including determining the future real estate of Antioch College, and how the name associated with Antioch College and Antioch University will be protected and reserved by either or both parties." The refocus on reopening Antioch College, whose first students arrived in the fall of 2011, ended funding of Nonstop Liberal Arts Institute.
