= Tom Manley (college president) =

American academic administrator

Thomas Manley

President of Antioch College
- In office 2015 – December 2020

President of the Pacific Northwest College of Art
- In office July 2003 – 2015

Personal details
- Born: Baltimore, Maryland, U.S.
- Spouse: Susanne Hashim
- Education: Towson University (BS); Claremont Graduate University (MA, Ed.D)

Thomas Manley is an American academic administrator who served as the president of Antioch College until December 1, 2020.

== Early life and education ==
Manley is a native of Baltimore, Maryland. He received a Bachelor of Science in East Asian history and Education from Towson University, and a master's degree in Asian studies and Doctor of Education from Claremont Graduate University in Claremont, California.

== Career ==
From 1981 to 2003, Manley held a variety of administrative posts at Pitzer College and the Claremont Colleges. He was instrumental in developing Pitzer's study abroad program, including sites in China, Costa Rica, Ecuador, Italy, Japan, Nepal, Turkey, Venezuela, Wales, and South Africa.

Manley served as President of the Pacific Northwest College of Art from July 2003 to late-2015. Among his milestones at PNCA was a successful cultivation of the largest gift to an arts organization in Oregon's history. Manley was also instrumental in the acquisition and renovation of a new campus for the college. However, the expansion led to chronic financial difficulties, leading to PNCA's acquisition by Willamette University in 2020.

A specialist on Japan, Manley also served as a scholar-in-residence at a women's college outside of Osaka and later helped to write the curriculum for an American-style liberal arts college—the first of its kind to be accredited by the Japanese Ministry of Education. He has also developed a number of cross-cultural and language learning innovations, including a portfolio journal system known as the “Fieldbook.”

Manley was hired as the new President of Antioch College in 2015, succeeding Mark Roosevelt in March 2016 as the second President of the reopened institution. In July 2018, Inside Higher Ed reported that “faculty members have grown increasingly unsettled about Antioch College’s future” after it required “a period of furloughs and pay cuts.” Antioch has “lost a reported $1.7 million for the year ending June 30, 2017, a year in which its expenses totaled $17.6 million.” Spring of 2020 saw furloughs for as many as 27 staff members, hour reductions for others, and pay cuts for faculty and other higher-earning personnel. On June 23, 2020, the college announced a spending cut of $2.5 million for the fiscal year beginning July 1, 2020, down about 20% from the prior fiscal year’s budget. Eight furloughed staff employees were laid off; and, faculty was reduced by six, through voluntary and negotiated departures and one retirement. Antioch also arranged the sale of the Glen Helen Nature Preserve to the Glen Helen Association, since the college could not afford to continue support of that facility.

In August 2020, Antioch indicated President Manley would be leaving at the end of his 5-year contract, in June 2021. It was subsequently announced that Manley would be leaving early, effective December 1, 2020. Jane Fernandes succeeded Manley in August 2021.

== Personal life ==
Manley is married to Susanne Hashim and they have one child. Manley also has a son and two step-children.

Academic offices
Preceded by Mark Roosevelt	President of Antioch College; 2016–2020	Succeeded by Jane Fernandes
