= Coretta Scott King Center for Cultural and Intellectual Freedom =

Education and community center at Antioch College

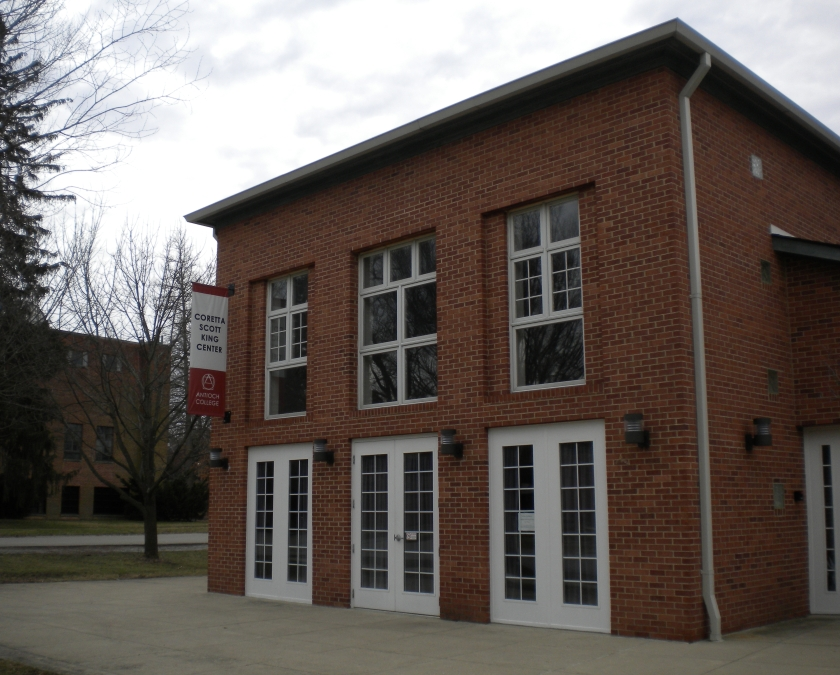
- Founder: Coretta Scott King
- Established: 2005
- Mission: The Coretta Scott King Center facilitates learning, dialogue, and action to advance social justice.
- Focus: To transform lives, the nation and the world by cultivating change agents, collaborating with communities, and fostering networks to advance human rights and social justice.
- Staff: Queen Meccasia Zabriskie
- Address: 781 Livermore St, Yellow Springs, OH 45387
- Location: Antioch College, Yellow Springs, Ohio, United States
- Website: https://cskc.antiochcollege.edu

Coretta Scott King (Class of 1951) gifted her name to Antioch College to create the Coretta Scott King Center in 2005. Fitting with the college's longstanding strength in experiential learning, the agreement stated that the center would be used as an experiential teaching center on issues of race, class, gender, diversity, and social justice for the campus and the surrounding community. The current Director of the Center is Queen Meccasia Zabriskie.

The Center hosts a variety of programming such as civil rights trips, Kingian nonviolence workshops, gun control forum, and social justice symposiums. It also holds annual events including the Martin Luther King Lecture, the Coretta Scott King Legacy Luncheon.

The Coretta Scott King Center gives annual awards to recognize those who act for justice nationally, locally, and on campus. The highest award—the Coretta Scott King Legacy Award—has been presented to Congresswoman Eleanor Holmes Norton (an Antioch College alumna from the Class of 1960), Tamika Mallory, Bernard Lafayette, and Opal Tometi.
