= Victor Goertzel =

American psychologist and author

Victor Goertzel (July 22, 1914 – May 23, 1999) was an American psychologist, author, and activist who stood up for Japanese internees in the United States during World War II. He wrote the book Cradles of Eminence in 1962 with his wife Mildred about the childhoods of accomplished people. Ted Goertzel is their son. He was a civil libertarian.

Goertzel was born in Chicago and moved with his family to New York City. He was expelled from high school for expressing support for the U.S.S.R. Goertzel graduated from the University of California at Berkeley with a degree in psychology in 1938. He received a doctorate in clinical psychology in 1953. Victor and Mildred Goertzel contributed to Ted and Ben Goertzel's book on Linus Pauling.

== Bibliography ==
- Cradles of Eminence with Mildred Goertzel(1962)
- Three Hundred Eminent Personalities with Mildred Goertzel
- "Studies of Voluntary Psychiatric Patients"
