= Antioch University Midwest =

Antioch University campus in Ohio

Antioch University Midwest (Yellow Springs, OH)
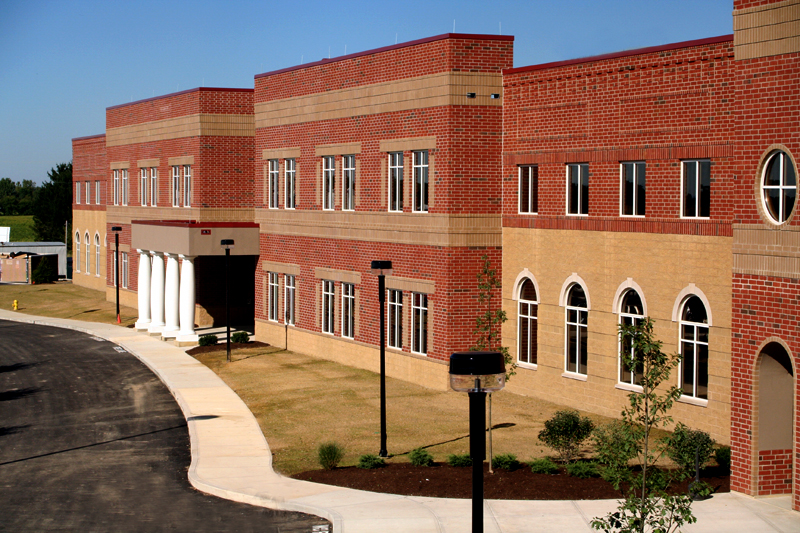
- Former names: School of Adult and Experiential Learning; The McGregor School; Antioch University McGregor
- Type: Private
- Established: 1852; 174 years ago
- Parent institution: Antioch University
- President: Lori E. Varlotta
- Provost: Sandra Madar
- Location: 900 Dayton Street, Yellow Springs, Ohio, 45387, United States; 39°48′13″N 83°54′31″W
- Campus: Rural, small-town
- Language: English
- Website: www.antioch.edu

Antioch University Midwest (AUM) was a campus of a private institution of higher education serving adult students in Yellow Springs, Ohio. Previously the campus was named Antioch University McGregor after the management professor and theorist Douglas McGregor, who served as the President of Antioch College from 1948 to 1954. On June 12, 2010, the campus officially adopted its final name.

By 2020, the Midwest campus in-person programs were absorbed into Antioch's online program. The Yellow Springs location still serves as Antioch University's headquarters and administrative offices, as well as the location of its low-residency and online program offerings.

The Midwest campus was part of the Antioch University system that includes Antioch University New England in Keene, New Hampshire; Antioch University Seattle in Seattle, Washington; Antioch University Los Angeles in Los Angeles, California; and, Antioch University Santa Barbara in Santa Barbara, California.

The original Antioch College, out of which the University system grew, is no longer part of the system, and has been reborn as an independent liberal arts college in Yellow Springs.

== Background ==
Antioch College was founded in 1852 as a progressive non-sectarian and co-educational institution of higher learning. Antioch's first president was Horace Mann, the revolutionary educational philosopher whose famous quote, "Be Ashamed To Die Until You Have Won Some Victory For Mankind," is still spoken annually at all Antioch University commencement ceremonies.

Horace Mann daguerreotype by Mathew Brady

Under Mann's leadership, Antioch College took the Harvard academic model of Latin, Greek, mathematics, history, philosophy, and science to a new level, with an emphasis on educating the "whole individual" with a commitment to social and moral character. The first graduating class consisted of 28 students, with an annual tuition of $24.

Antioch College was also the first to offer courses in the methods of teaching. Rebecca Pennell, one of the College's ten original faculty members taught courses in this area and was the first female college professor in the United States to have the same rank and pay as her male colleagues.

Arthur E. Morgan was president of Antioch College from 1920 to 1936, developing a curriculum in which students alternate on-campus study with off-campus work experience, furthering the Antioch tradition of developing the whole person through education and experiential learning.

Douglas McGregor, a renowned social scientist and management theorist, served as president of Antioch College from 1948 to 1954. McGregor authored a highly influential book, "The Human Side of Enterprise," which revolutionized labor relations by conceiving of employees as inherently creative and self-motivated individuals who had something to offer an organization ("Theory Y"). This notion rippled through the world of managerial practice, challenging the belief that employees must be commanded and controlled because of an inherent desire to avoid work whenever possible ("Theory X").

This socially progressive outlook inspires the role of Antioch University today.

== History ==
During the 1970s and most of the 1980s, Antioch College offered distance learning to adult students, through the Center for Adult Learning (CAL) and the Individualized Master of Arts (IMA) program. In 1988, these two programs became the School of Adult and Experiential Learning (SAEL), separating from the College and becoming an independent part of Antioch University.

In 1994, SAEL became the McGregor School of Antioch University. Dr. Barbara Gellman-Danley assumed the role of President on May 1, 1999. The McGregor School and Antioch College shared the original campus in Yellow Springs, the College providing residential education to traditionally aged students seeking bachelor's degrees, and The McGregor School providing a bachelor's degree completion program to non-traditional students, and master's degrees.

In 2000, The McGregor School was renamed Antioch University McGregor, and in the fall of 2007 AUM moved onto a new campus in Yellow Springs, citing access to technologies and modern facilities as central to its continued growth. The board of Antioch University closed the original Antioch College in 2008, but an association of alumni subsequently purchased its name and assets from the university and Antioch College reopened as a separate, independent, four-year liberal arts college in 2011.

In 2010, Antioch University McGregor was renamed Antioch University Midwest.

By late 2020, Antioch University Midwest's on-campus programming was absorbed into Antioch University Online, and its building put up for sale. However, university administration, Antioch University Online, and Antioch University’s Graduate School of Leadership & Change remained headquartered at the campus building in Yellow Springs location.

== AUM enrollment statistics ==
At one time, AUM enrolled more than 900 students, with 76% in the graduate programs and 24% in the undergraduate programs. The average student age was 39, with approximately 75% of enrollees being female. In 2007, AUM received a Diversity Award from Minority Access, Inc. for their commitment to "inclusion of diverse perspectives" throughout the curriculum, and a 30% minority representation in the student body.

== AUM programs ==
AUM offered bachelor's degrees in Liberal Arts, Early and Middle Childhood Education with Ohio Licensure, Middle Childhood Education with Ohio Licensure, Special Education, Intervention Specialist with Ohio Licensure, Management, Healthcare Administration, Human Services Administration, and Applied Technology and Business Leadership. BA Liberal Arts students can choose from six concentrations, including Conflict Studies, Creative Writing and Literature, Education Studies, Environmental Sustainability, Humanities, and Information Technology. Two undergraduate certificates were available in Conflict Studies and Data Analytics.

At the graduate level, AUM offered Master of Arts degrees in Management and Change Leadership, as well as the Individualized Master of Arts. Antioch University Midwest also offered a Master of Business Administration with a concentration in Healthcare Administration, as well as a number of Masters of Education (MEd) programs, licensures, and endorsements certified by the Council for the Accreditation of Educator Preparation (CAEP), formerly known as the National Council for Accreditation of Teacher Education (NCATE).

Teacher licensure was available for early childhood education, middle childhood education, adolescent, and intervention specialist at both the mild to moderate and moderate to intensive levels. Educators could seek the Ohio Principal Licensure as part of the Masters of Education in Educational Leadership or they may pursue the MEd only. An MEd in Educational Leadership with professional concentrations was also available for professional educators and administrators that want to tailor a degree program for their career. Endorsements are offered for Reading PK-12 and Early Childhood Generalist grades 4 and 5. Certificates were available in Reggio Emilia approach, Dyslexia Studies, Coaching and Mentoring, and Trauma-Informed Education. Class offerings for the education programs were administered in a cohort model with classes occurring on weekday evenings.

The Reggio Emilia, Dyslexia Studies, and Trauma-Informed Education certificates are currently offered online through Antioch University's New England campus. The Master of Business Administration (MBA) program is offered online.
