= Antioch Network =

The Antioch Network (internally referred to as The Network) was an extension of branch campuses, study centers, and initiatives spun out of Antioch College in Yellow Springs, Ohio. The Network was the precursor of Antioch College's university system, eventually renamed as Antioch University.

== Formation of The Network ==
Antioch College's expansion beyond its Yellow Springs campus began in the late 1950s. Expansion accelerated in earnest in the mid–1960s when Antioch College President James P. Dixon encouraged the establishment of a series of branch campuses and centers (part of the University Without Walls movement) with the idea of extending the impact of Antioch's innovative educational ideas. In addition to locations founded by Antioch faculty, some schools, especially those which sought to serve historically marginalized and underserved communities such as Juarez–Lincoln University, were added to the Network in order to operate under Antioch College's accreditation. The Network's branches reached beyond traditional college-age students into the realm of adult learners. More than 40 Antioch affiliated "learning communities" were created into the early 1970s by faculty, as well as by outside community groups, non-profit organizations, and entrepreneurs.

One of the earliest expansions was Antioch College's pioneering international program, Antioch Education Abroad (AEA), established in 1957. In February 2016, Antioch University sold AEA to Carleton College which took over operation of the study abroad programs in Cameroon, Europe, and India. Carleton was fortunate to retain the excellent leadership of the programs' faculty directors, all of whom are now members of the faculty at Carleton.

The Antioch Graduate School of Education in Putney, Vermont (or Antioch-Putney), was the first campus established with the 1964 purchase of the Putney School of Education. The Graduate School of Education evolved over the years with different names and locations (it moved to Harrisville, Vermont and then Keene, New Hampshire) and became what is now known as Antioch University New England.

The Antioch School of Law was a notable campus founded in 1972 and operated until 1988 when it was absorbed into the University of the District of Columbia.

== Challenges and Contraction ==
While Antioch College and the branches shared common core educational principles, significant cultural and structural differences resulted in a lack of cohesion. Unlike the college, the branches did not have a system of academic tenure. While the Antioch College was a residential liberal arts college, the branches differed significantly with a student body of commuting adult learners. Additionally, Antioch College was governed under a robust model of shared governance, but many of the branches were formed without the input or oversight of ComCil (the core governing body) resulting in a general lack of support for these external enterprises. Academic standards also varied widely among the branches and between the college.

Convoluted extensions of The Network complicated the situation. Many of the branches were not originated from Antioch College, but rather as derivatives of the branches themselves, further outside the oversight of the college. Most of the branches had no direct connection to programs or faculty of the college. A primary criticism of The Network was that drew administrative energy away from the college.

Compounding these issues was that many of the branches were not financially sound. Cashflow issues and outright financial failures put stress on the college's budget leading to the closure of most of the branches beginning in 1975 and continuing through the late 1980s. Contraction of the Network was executed under President William Birenbaum, noted for his acumen in "crisis-type settings," reducing the size of the Network by nearly three-quarters.

== Formation of University System ==
Even as the system of branch centers and campuses were being closed, President William Birenbaum also oversaw the formal name change of the corporation to Antioch University in 1978.

The contracted university consisted of five units in addition to Antioch College. Two of these were housed on the campus of the college: the School for Adult and Experiential Learning, which later became Antioch McGregor, and Antioch Education Abroad, later renamed Antioch International.

The college was the center of the university system, but tensions between the different models of education and governance were the source of many rifts. Budgetary structures also proved problematic. The college budget bore many expenses which benefited the entire enterprise, but also caused the college's balance sheet to compare less favorably in relation to other campuses.

== Separation of Antioch College and Antioch University ==
A major structural shift occurred in 1993 with the creation of the University Chancellor which had leadership over all of Antioch's campuses. Previously the president of Antioch College was the chief officer with provosts of the university campuses reporting directly. The role was first filled by a former president of the college, Alan Guskin, but later by a former president of a university campus. Where the college had previously been central to the university, the structural shift created a reality where the college was just one of many parts, and was actually an outlier which was significantly different from the other campuses.

Over time, administration and trustee leaders lost sight of the historic College as the core of the university, and a decision was made to close the original Antioch College. The rationale for closure was that the branch campuses were more financially sustainable than the college which was no longer financially viable (despite accounting inequality which applied university-wide liabilities solely to the college budget).

After lengthy negotiation, Antioch College emerged as a newly independent institution due to the efforts of its alumni. Now two separate entities, Antioch College occupies the original campus in Yellow Springs, Ohio and operates in its tradition as a progressive liberal arts college, while Antioch University operates five campuses in addition to an online program and a Ph.D program with residency rotating among its campuses.

== List of Antioch Network Centers and Campuses ==
The nature of Antioch's expansion was such that no one knows for sure how many branches existed as some were more formally established than others. The following is a partial list of Network centers and locations.

- Antioch College - 1850 (established as independent from Antioch University in 2009)
- Antioch New England Graduate School (Antioch University New England), Keene, NH. Began 1964 (part of AGSE 1964–1975)
- Antioch University Los Angeles, founded 1972.
- Antioch University Santa Barbara, founded 1977.
- Antioch University Seattle, founded 1975.
- Graduate School of Leadership and Change
- Antioch University Online

=== Closed Units ===
- Study Abroad Programs
  - Antioch Education Abroad (now Carelton Global Engagement) - 1957
  - Short-term programs abroad - 1957
  - Tübingen, Germany. Began 1958 (later called Antioch in Germany)

^ Antioch Education Abroad (AEA) programs and IMA program part of unit called Antioch International or Antioch Continuing and International Education, 1973–1988.

- AEA: Guanajuato, Mexico - 1958–1969
- National Science Foundation Institute, Yellow Springs - 1959–1973
- AEA: Bogota, Colombia - 1964–1980^
- Antioch Graduate School of Education (AGSE) - 1964–1976 (dissolved 1976)
  - Putney, VT - 1964–1971 (moved to Harrisville, NH)
  - Harrisville, NH - 1971–1974 (moved to Keene, NH)
  - Washington, DC - 1966–1974
  - Philadelphia, PA - 1967–1978 (merged with Antioch Philadelphia in 1978)
  - Baltimore, MD - 1968–1969 (became Sojourner-Douglass College)
  - Yellow Springs, OH - 1967–1976
  - Juarez-Lincoln Centers in Texas - 1971–1979 (merged with Antioch West in 1977)
  - Denver, CO - 1973–1983 (merged with Antioch West in 1983)
- Kauai, HI. 1967–1969
- Washington-Baltimore Campus - 1969–1973 (dissolved 1973)
  - Columbia, MD (also called Antioch Maryland) - 1969–1982
  - Baltimore, MD (also called Antioch Maryland) - 1970–1982
  - Washington, DC (Center for Basic Human Problems) - 1970–1977
- Colegio Jacinto Trevino Centers in Texas - 1970–1974
- The Teachers Inc., New York, NY - 1970–1976
- Portland, OR - 1970–1972
- Antioch Philadelphia, PA - 1971–1989
- Harlem Hospital, New York, NY - 1971–1975
- Antioch Appalachia, Beckley, WV - 1971–1978
- Antioch Minneapolis, MN- 1971–1978
- Navajo Project, NM - 1971–1973
- George Meany Center, Silver Spring, MD - 1973
- Antioch West (headquarters in San Francisco, CA) - 1971–1985 (dissolved in 1985)
  - San Francisco, CA - 1971–1989
  - Corpus Christi - TX. 1973–1977
  - North Slope, AK - 1974–1975
  - Monterey, CA - 1975–1983
  - Honolulu, HI - 1979–1985
- Antioch School of Law, Washington DC - 1972–1988 (now David A. Clarke School of Law)
- Center for Understanding Media, New York, NY - 1972–1975
- Homestead Montebello Center, Baltimore, MD - 1972–1980
- E.W. Cook Institute, Faribault, MN - 1973–1986
- Vancouver Island, BC, Canada - 1973–1975
- Institute of Open Education, Cambridge, MA - 1973–1982
- NAES College, Chicago, IL - 1974–1985
- Antioch University Midwest - 1988-2020 (formerly Antioch McGregor, formerly McGregor School, formerly School for Adult & Experiential Learning, Yellow Springs)
  - Individualized MA program (IMA) - 1975^
  - Weekend BA program - 1986
