= Antioch School of Law =

Law school in Washington, D.C.

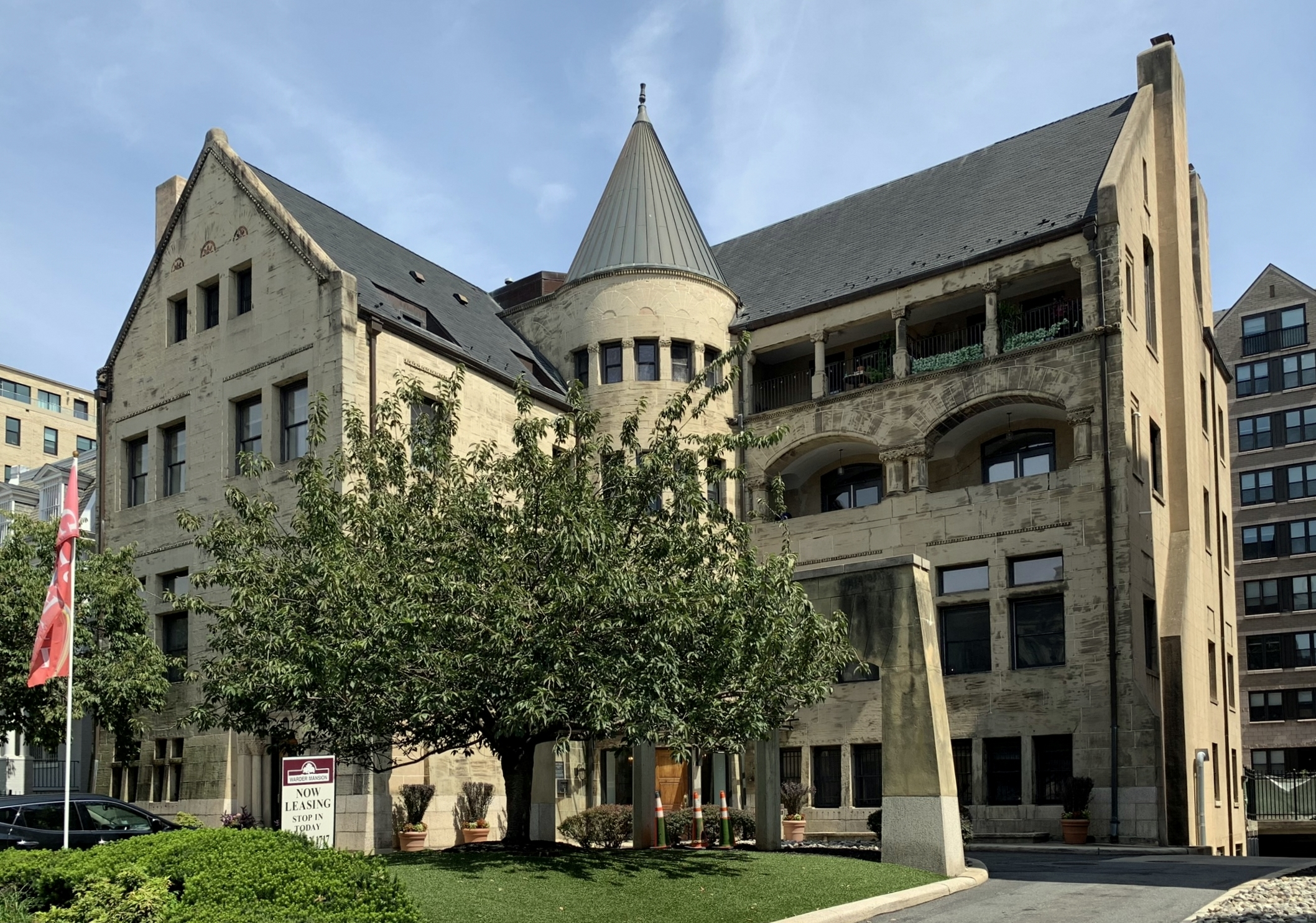
- Active: 1972–1986
- Founders: Edgar S. Cahn; Jean Camper Cahn
- Location: 2633 16th Street NW; Washington, D.C., U.S. 38°55′26.4″N 77°2′9.96″W

Antioch School of Law was a law school in Washington, D.C. which specialized in public advocacy. The school now operates as the University of the District of Columbia David A. Clarke School of Law (UDC-DCSL).

The school was located in the historic Warder Mansion on 16th Street NW and its law library a block away on Crescent Place NW in the Adams-Morgan neighborhood of Washington, D.C., near Meridian Hill Park.

== Founding and educational philosophy ==
Antioch School of Law was run under the auspices of Antioch College in Yellow Springs, Ohio, long a pioneer in educational innovation, which, at various points in its history, operated as many as 32 separate entities in several states, as well as abroad as part of the Antioch Network.

The school was established in 1972 by Edgar S. Cahn and Jean Camper Cahn, longtime champions of the legal rights of low-income and minority persons. The Cahns were also instrumental in establishing the federal Legal Services Corporation during the administration of President Lyndon Johnson. They served as the first deans of the school, and envisioned a law school focused on training highly skilled attorneys dedicated to public interest advocacy. During its first school year, it had 145 students enrolled, taught by 15 faculty members. Of those 145 students, 30 percent were women and 33 percent were people of color. The school was fully ABA accredited for the class of 1977 (who entered in 1974), and operated until 1988.

The school pioneered a comprehensive law clinic education model espoused by Edmond Cahn, a law professor at Columbia University and Edgar's father in the 1930s. His concept was to train lawyers like doctors in a clinical model, as opposed to the pure Langdell Case method use by Harvard and most other law schools, and to use those lawyers in training to provide legal services to those unable to afford lawyers. Edgar and Jean brought his ideas to life in Antioch's teaching law firm, a combination Legal Services office and law school. Since then, clinical legal education has now been acknowledged by the American Bar Association and the Association of American Law Schools as being an essential part of a complete legal education, and has been incorporated to some degree into the curriculum of virtually every law school in the United States.

The school, in fact, was envisioned as more than a law school. It was to be a public interest law firm with teacher-lawyers and student-advocates providing pro bono legal services to the poor and others who were unable to obtain representation. The intent was to create an intense combination of learning and practice. New students also spent their first eight weeks, later reduced to two weeks at the school living with families in Washington's slums to get an understanding of the legal needs and institutional barriers of the people whom the students would soon be representing. This was part of the school's effort to inculcate in its students the passion to eradicate injustice in society. When it closed, Antioch School of Law had handled over 10,000 public-interest cases.

From the beginning, Antioch's approach to admissions was far less test-score oriented than most other law schools. The Cahns said they wanted "good" students as well as "bright" ones. They sought students who were more mature and had life experience which demonstrated competency and capacity to initiate and complete tasks in support of social justice. The class gender balance in the incoming class of 1975 was 50/50 men to women, (average female law school admissions at the time was less than 10%) and about 35 percent persons of color and other minorities, with an average age in the late 20s with many students who had successful pre-law school careers. They recognized that not only do those who lack a conventional cultural or educational background have the potential to become good lawyers, they often, uniquely, have the motivation and life experiences to become great advocates for change and social justice. Antioch provided many students an opportunity to attend law school that they probably would not have been afforded otherwise.

In addition to its professional degree program, which led to the Juris Doctor degree, permitting graduates to seek licensure as attorneys in all American jurisdictions, the school also initially offered an advanced degree program leading to the Masters of Law (LLM) in Trial Advocacy and later a Masters in the Arts of Teaching (MAT) in clinical legal education. In addition, Antioch School of Law offered an M.A. in Legal Studies, one of the first law schools to do so in the 1980s and a number of paralegal programs.

== Closing ==
By the early 1980s, faced with growing financial challenges, and a diminished federal funding commitment to its educational approach, Antioch was forced to scale back its operations. In September 1985, Antioch University President Alan G. Guskin said that the law school would need to close within two years unless it could raise $2.5 million within 60 days. The main Antioch University campus had been spending $4 million each year, a cost it decided it could no longer sustain.

In 1986, after the announcement of the law school's impending closing, Antioch Law students and alumni mounted a spirited grassroots campaign that did meet the school’s monetary needs. The District of Columbia City Council authorized the establishment of the District of Columbia School of Law, as the District of Columbia’s publicly funded law school.

Facing ongoing financial troubles and ongoing accreditation challenges, on March 27, 1996, the Board of Trustees of the University of the District of Columbia voted 10–2 to allow the District of Columbia to absorb the law school and rename it the District of Columbia School of Law. Although it had no formal connection to Antioch, the District of Columbia School of Law specifically adopted Antioch's mission and curriculum, including the clinical legal education components, employed many of its faculty, and afforded Antioch School of Law alumni full rights as alumni of the new law school. Renamed in 1998, what had constituted the professional degree curriculum of Antioch School of Law now operates as the University of the District of Columbia David A. Clarke School of Law, a fully accredited institution with over two hundred students.

Initially, the LL.M. in trial advocacy program was adopted as it existed by George Washington University Law School, and operated under that school's aegis. In the ensuing years, however, the program was gradually diminished, and now exists only in truncated form as a three-credit, six-day offering known as the College of Trial Advocacy, and in various other courses in advanced advocacy skills and dispute resolution, at George Washington.

In the winter of 2009, the Chancellor of Antioch University set as a priority the exploration of reopening the Antioch School of Law.

== Notable alumni ==
- Kevin M. Dougherty, associate justice on the Supreme Court of Pennsylvania
- Maryellen Fullerton, lawyer and former interim dean and law professor of law at Brooklyn Law School
- Sherwood Guernsey, Massachusetts state representative
- John Ramsey Johnson, associate judge on the Superior Court of the District of Columbia
- Thomas L. Kilbride, legal aid attorney and now former Justice/Chief Justice on the Illinois Supreme Court
- Brig Owens, former NFL player
- Anil C. Singh, associate justice New York Supreme Court Appellate Division
- George J. Terwilliger III, partner at McGuire Woods and co-led George W. Bush's legal team during the Florida recount of the 2000 Presidential Election.
- Tim Rieser, U.S. Senate staff member specializing in foreign policy.

== See also ==
- List of defunct law schools in the United States
