= David A. Clarke School of Law =

School of University of the District of Columbia

Coordinates: 38.9435°N 77.0633°W

University of the District of Columbia David A. Clarke School of Law
- Motto: Practice Law. Promote Justice. Change Lives.
- Parent school: University of the District of Columbia
- Established: 1986
- School type: Public law school
- Dean: Angela Gilmore
- Location: Washington, D.C., United States
- Enrollment: 247
- Faculty: 25 full-time, 31 part-time
- USNWR ranking: 180-196 (bottom 7.69% at most) (2024)
- Bar pass rate: 47.92% (2023 first-time takers)
- Website: www.law.udc.edu

The University of the District of Columbia David A. Clarke School of Law (UDC Law) is the law school of the University of the District of Columbia, a public historically black land-grant university in Washington, D.C. It is named after David A. Clarke and was established in 1986 when, in response to a local grassroots campaign, the Council of the District of Columbia decided to take over assets of the Antioch School of Law, whose parent institution Antioch University had decided to close it in the face of increasing financial problems. The new school was named the University of the District of Columbia David A. Clarke School of Law in 1998.

== History ==
UDC Law was established as the District of Columbia School of Law after Antioch University decided to close its law school. The Antioch School of Law was a Washington, D.C. school established as part of Antioch College's Antioch Network in 1972 by Jean Camper Cahn and Edgar S. Cahn, a married interracial couple dedicated to improving legal services for poor people.

Eager to retain the Antioch School of Law's mission, curriculum, clinical programs, and some personnel for the benefit of the city, in 1986 Antioch School of Law students, alumni and local legal and civic leaders mounted a successful grassroots campaign to persuade the Council of the District of Columbia to pass legislation that re-established the school as the District of Columbia School of Law (DCSL). The Council of the District of Columbia later passed legislation merging the School of Law with the University of the District of Columbia in 1996. In 1998 President Clinton signed legislation renaming the School after former D.C. Council Chair David A. Clarke, a civil rights leader and long-time advocate for the law school and its mission.

The District of Columbia School of Law was awarded provisional accreditation by the American Bar Association in 1991, while the David A. Clarke School of Law was awarded provisional accreditation shortly after its renaming in 1998. It was awarded full accreditation by a unanimous vote of the ABA House of Delegates on August 8, 2005.

On May 15, 2020, the council of the American Bar Association's Section of Legal Education and Admissions to the Bar met remotely and determined this school and nine others had significant noncompliance with Standard 316. This Standard was revised in 2019 to provide that at least 75% of an accredited law school's graduates who took a bar exam must pass one within two years of graduation. The school had been asked to submit a report by Feb. 1, 2021; and, if the council did not find the report demonstrated compliance, the school would be asked to appear before the council at its May, 2021 meeting. By August 2020, the School of Law was able to demonstrate compliance, asserting the class of 2018 had a two-year bar passage rate of 75.3%, and its class of 2019 was showing progress toward a 75% pass rate. The August council also specifically found that the school was in compliance with Standards 501(b) and Interpretation 501–1, which deal with admissions policies and practices. However, in late 2022, the school was again found out of compliance for having an actual 67.24% pass rate for the class of 2019. The school indicated the 2019 results were an anomaly. The ABA determined the school was back in compliance by March 2023. However, as of early 2024, based on statistics for 2021 graduates, the school had a two year pass rate of just 57.14%.

== Admissions ==
UDC Law enrolled 247 students for the 2018–19 academic year and 63% of J.D. students were racial minorities. In 2018, UDC received 584 applications, of which 207 (35.4%) were offered admission. Of those 207 admitted, 61 (29.5%) matriculated. The median LSAT score for students enrolling in UDC in 2018 was 147, and the median undergraduate GPA was 2.92.

== Academics ==
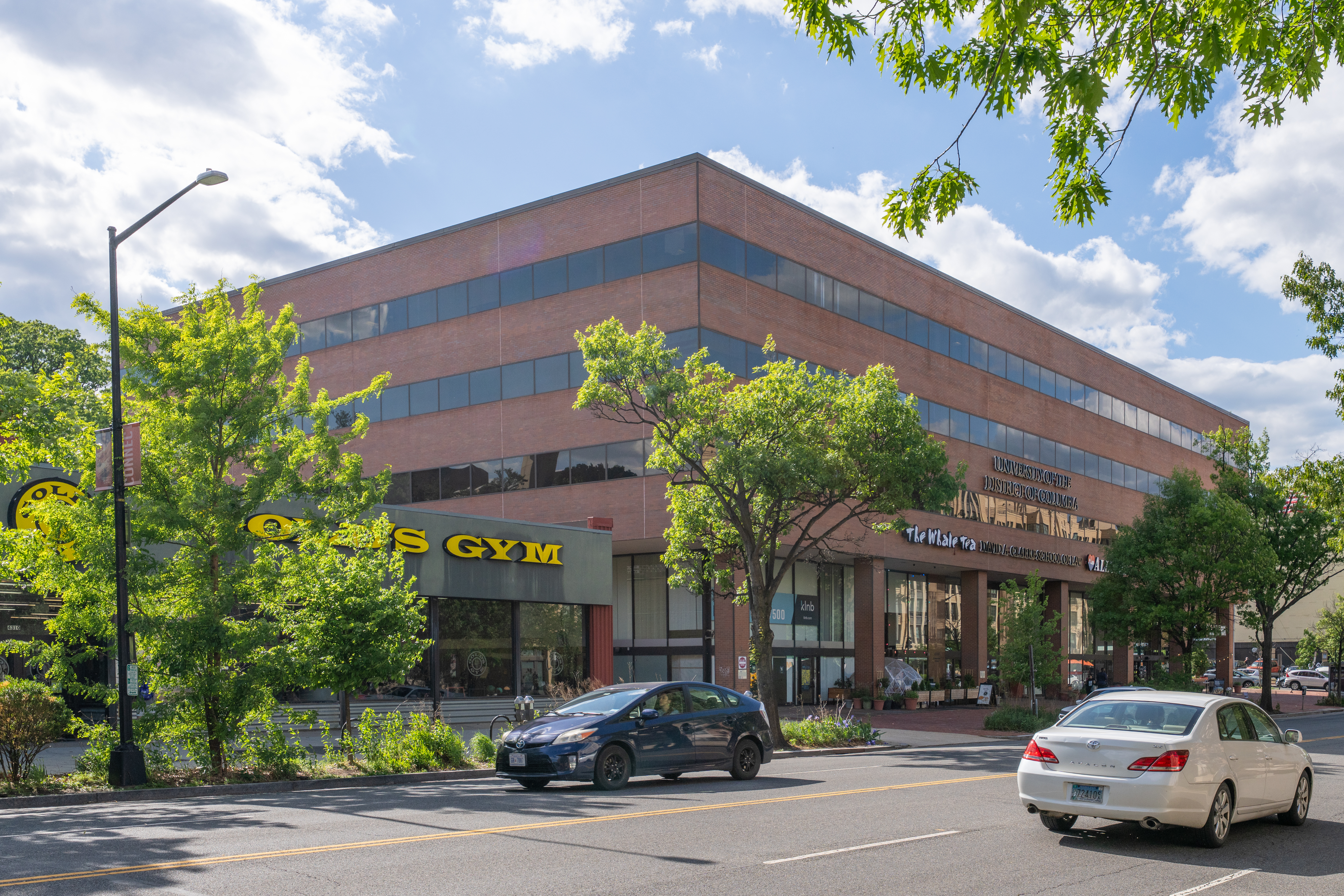
David A. Clarke School of Law Building (2026)

=== Curriculum ===
The school requires full-time first year students to take courses on Civil Procedure, Contracts, Criminal Law, Criminal Procedure, Law & Justice, Lawyering Process, and Torts. Upper-division full-time students are required to take clinical courses and courses on Constitutional Law, Evidence, Moot Court, Professional Responsibility, and Property.

=== Degrees offered ===
UDC Law students can earn their J.D. in three years as full-time students or in four years as part-time students. The school also offers a two-year LL.M. program with concentrations in Clinical Education, Social Justice, and Systems Change.

=== Faculty ===
The school had 25 full-time faculty and 31 part-time/visiting faculty as of 2023.

=== Experiential learning ===
Each first-year UDC Law student is required to perform a minimum of 40 hours of community service with a DC non-profit or government agency as part of the Community Service Law and Justice course. After completion of the first year, all UDC Law students are eligible for paid summer public interest fellowships. UDC Law also has an externship program that allows students to earn academic credit for closely supervised law-related work done in conjunction with the UDC Law's Externship Course. In addition, UDC Law has a service-learning program that facilitates law student, staff and faculty service at family detention centers in Texas and elsewhere.

However, the heart of UDC Law's experiential program is its legal clinics, and all upper-division students are required to take two clinical classes.

The school offers the following clinics:

- Community Development Clinic
- Criminal Law Clinic (with DC Law Students in Court, located in the UDC Law building)
- Whistleblower Protection Clinic – at the Government Accountability Project
- General Practice Law Clinic
- Housing & Consumer Law Clinic
- Immigration & Human Rights Clinic
- Juvenile & Special Education Law Clinic
- Legislation Clinic
- Low-Income Taxpayers Clinic

=== Ranking ===
For 2024, U.S. News & World Report ranked UDC Law in the category #180-196 out of 196 ABA accredited law schools, being in the bottom 7.69% of those schools, at most.

== Bar examination passage ==
In 2022, the overall bar examination passage rate for the law school’s first-time examination takers was 38.85%.

== Employment ==
ABA Employment Summary for 2018 Graduates
Employment Status	Percentage
Employed – Bar Passage Required	38.8%
Employed – J.D. Advantage	32.8%
Employed – Professional Position	7.5%
Employed – Non-Professional Position	4.5%
Employed – Law School/University Funded	1.5%
Employed – Undeterminable	1.5%
Pursuing Graduate Degree Full Time	1.5%
Unemployed – Start Date Deferred	3%
Unemployed – Not Seeking	0%
Unemployed – Seeking	9%
Employment Status Unknown	0%
Total of 67 Graduates

According to UDC Law's 2019 ABA-required disclosures, 38.8% of the Class of 2018 obtained full-time long-term JD-required employment nine months after graduation. Most of the graduates employed worked for law firms of 2-10 attorneys or the government.

Washington, D.C., Virginia, and Maryland were the top employment locations for 2016 graduates.

== Student life ==
UDC Law students can participate in more than 30 student organizations, reflecting a variety of legal and social justice interests.

== Costs ==
The 2018–2019 tuition rates for full-time students are $12,838 for District residents, $18,756 for metropolitan area residents, and $24,674 per semester for non-District residents. Tuition rates for part-time, visiting and non-matriculating students are $402 per credit hour for D.C. residents, $601 per credit hour for metropolitan area residents, and $802 per credit hour for non-District residents. The total cost of attendance (including the cost of tuition, fees, and living expenses) at UDC Law for the 2018–2019 academic year is estimated to be $55,301 for full-time students who are D.C. residents and $78,973 for full-time students who are non-residents. The total debt for graduates as calculated by Law School Transparency is $158,946.

== Notable alumni ==
Including graduates of the closed Antioch School of Law:

- Tiffany T. Alston (2002), member of the Maryland House of Delegates suspended from office in 2012 after being found guilty of stealing General Assembly funds
- Thelma Buchholdt (1991) (deceased 2007), member of the Alaska House of Representatives from 1974 through 1982 and author
- Tom Devine (Antioch 1980), attorney specializing in whistleblower rights
- Maryellen Fullerton (Antioch 1978), attorney and law professor
- Michael Horsey (Antioch attended), member of the Pennsylvania House of Representatives
- Aviva Kempner (Antioch 1976), documentary filmmaker
- Thomas Kilbride (Antioch 1981), Chief Justice and Associate Justice, Supreme Court of Illinois
- Michael D. Kohn (Antioch 1985), attorney specializing in whistleblower protection law
- Stevan Lieberman (1994), attorney specializing in intellectual property law and patent law
- Keiffer Mitchell (1994), former Member of the Maryland House of Delegates
- Susanne Steinem Patch (Antioch 1978), staff attorney for the Federal Trade Commission
- Tim Rieser (Antioch 1979), U.S. Senate staff member specializing in foreign policy
- Penfield Tate III (Antioch 1981), member of the Colorado House of Representatives and Colorado Senate
- George J. Terwilliger III (Antioch 1978), United States Attorney for the District of Vermont, United States Deputy Attorney General
- Jon Wellinghoff (Antioch 1975), Chairman of the Federal Energy Regulatory Commission
- Michael D. Wilson (Antioch 1979), Associate Justice of the Supreme Court of Hawaii
