= Edgar S. Cahn =

American lawyer and activist (1935–2022)

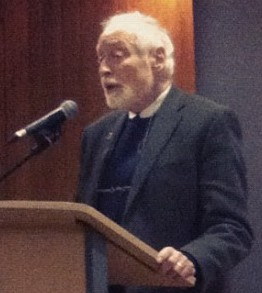
- Cahn in 2012
- Born: Edgar Stuart Cahn; March 23, 1935; New York City, New York, U.S.
- Died: January 23, 2022 (aged 86); Bethesda, Maryland, U.S.
- Education: Swarthmore College (BA); Yale University (MA, PhD, LLB)
- Occupations: Lawyer, author, educator
- Spouses: Jean Camper Cahn (m. 1957; died 1991) Christine Gray (m. 2000)
- Children: 2

Edgar Stuart Cahn (March 23, 1935 – January 23, 2022) was an American law professor, a counsel and speech writer to Robert F. Kennedy, and the creator of TimeBanking. He co-founded the Antioch School of Law (now the David A. Clarke School of Law at the University of the District of Columbia) with his late wife, Jean Camper Cahn. Cahn has also held positions at the University of Miami School of Law, Florida International University, the London School of Economics, and a visiting fellow at the Center for the Study of Human Rights at Columbia University. In later life, Cahn devoted most of his professional effort to TimeBanks USA, now TimeBanks.Org, a 501(c)3 nonprofit organization he established in 1995.

== Early life ==
Cahn was born in New York City on March 23, 1935. His father, Edmond, worked as a jurist and was close friends with several justices of the Supreme Court of the United States; his mother, Lenore (Zola), advocated for those who suffered elder abuse. Cahn studied English literature at Swarthmore College, graduating in 1956. He subsequently undertook postgraduate studies at Yale University, obtaining a master's degree in 1957 and a Doctor of Philosophy three years later. He then entered Yale Law School, graduating in 1963.

== Career ==
=== Kennedy and Johnson administrations ===
After receiving his law degree, Cahn started his career in government as special counsel and speechwriter for Attorney General Robert F. Kennedy. He wrote Robert Kennedy's 1964 University of Chicago Law Day address. In 1964, he served as the Executive Assistant to Sargent Shriver, focusing on issues related to poverty and hunger under the newly created Office of Economic Opportunity. In the same year, Cahn and his wife Jean Camper Cahn co-authored an article in the Yale Law Journal, "The War on Poverty: a Civilian Perspective". This article led to the establishment of the Legal Services Corporation.

=== Citizens Advocate Center ===
Cahn left government work in 1968 to focus on defending Native American civil rights. Cahn established the Citizens Advocate Center as a watchdog organization to "monitor governmental programs and assure equitable treatment of all community organizations in their dealing with the government." The Citizens Advocate Center published Our Brother's Keeper, the Indian in White America in collaboration with leading Native American rights activists in 1969. Such efforts helped catalyze the adoption of policies increasing the level of self-determination of Native American populations. By the 1970s, the organization had adopted a broader mission of "function[ing] as a watchdog of federal grant-making agencies having significant impact on low-income citizens ... and (increasing) the effectiveness and responsiveness of the administrative process, including the administration of federal housing programs."

=== Antioch School of Law ===
In 1971, Edgar and Jean Camper Cahn co-founded the Antioch School of Law, a subunit within a network of institutions run by Antioch University. Their stated aim was training new lawyers who would "use the law as a weapon against injustice." In their role as law-school deans, Edgar and Jean pioneered clinical legal education in the United States, incorporating clinical experience into a curriculum alongside the traditional case study method for the first time. When Antioch University began facing financial issues a few years later, the administration attempted to divert the law school's funding. Although the Cahns opposed this move, Antioch won a lawsuit against them in 1980, and fired them the following day.

When further financial distress at the university forced it to close several of its subunits in the late 1980s, the Council of the District of Columbia bought the school, renaming it the District of Columbia Law School, preserving the law school's faculty and curriculum. The new law school was awarded provisional American Bar Association accreditation in 1991 and incorporated into the University of the District of Columbia in 1996. Two years later, the institution was renamed in honor of David A. Clarke, a former city council chairman who had been particularly supportive of the school and its mission. The David A. Clarke School of Law at the University of the District of Columbia was awarded full ABA accreditation in 2005. Cahn joined the school as a Distinguished Professor of Law, remaining active until his death.

=== Later career ===
Cahn became a faculty member at the University of Miami School of Law in 1985. He also held academic positions at Florida International University, the London School of Economics, and Columbia University. Cahn later established TimeBanks USA in 1995, a nonprofit organization that helped US time banks. He had earlier made popular the notion of time dollars, in which individuals exchanged services with others in that particular community. An example of this would be bringing someone to an appointment in return for assistance with tax preparation.

== Personal life ==
Cahn married Jean Camper Cahn in 1957. She was the daughter of a respected physician in Baltimore. The couple were nicknamed "the double legal eagles" by Lewis F. Powell Jr. They remained married until her death in 1991. Together, they had two children: Jonathan and Reuben.

Cahn later married Christine Gray in 2000. They remained married until his death, and did not have children together. He died at a hospital in Bethesda, Maryland, on January 23, 2022, at the age of 86. Prior to his death, he suffered from congestive heart failure.

== Partial bibliography ==
- Hunger, U.S.A.: a report with an introductory comment by Robert F. Kennedy. Citizens' Board of Inquiry into Hunger and Malnutrition in the United States. Boston:Beacon Press, 1968. OCLC 000433081
- (with Jean Camper Cahn) Making Equal Justice Under Law a Reality: The Role of the Lawyer as Volunteer. Harriet Lowenstein Goldstein series: The volunteer in America 4; Florence Heller Graduate School for Advanced Studies in Social Welfare Papers in social welfare. Waltham, Massachusetts: Brandeis University, Florence Heller Graduate School for Advanced Studies in Social Welfare, 1968. OCLC 8622352
- (editor) Our Brother's Keeper: The Indian in White America. Washington, New Community Press, 1969. OCLC 45773
- (editor with Barry A. Passett) Citizen participation : a case book in democracy. Trenton, New Jersey: New Jersey Community Action Training Institute, 1969. OCLC 006162199
- (with Timothy Eichenberg & Roberta V. Romberg) The legal lawbreakers : a study of the nonadministration of Federal relocation requirements. Washington : Citizens Advocate Center, 1970 OCLC 019446142
- (editor with Barry A. Passett) Citizen Participation: Effecting Community Change. Praeger special studies in U.S. economic and social development. New York: Praeger, 1971. OCLC 141360
- (with Jonathan Rowe) Time Dollars: The New Currency that Enables Americans to Turn Their Hidden Resource - Time - into Personal Security & Community Renewal. Emmaus, Pennsylvania: Rodale, 1992. ISBN 978-0-87857-985-3
- No More Throwaway People: The Coproduction Imperative. Washington, DC: Essential Books, 2000. OCLC 044397909
