= Tim Rieser =

American lawyer

Personal details
- Political party: Democratic
- Education: Dartmouth College (BA); Antioch School of Law (JD)

Tim Rieser is a senior aide to Senator Peter Welch. Rieser previously worked for Senator Patrick Leahy for 37 years. He has been noted as one "of the most powerful staffers in Congress presiding over U.S. foreign policy and U.S. foreign assistance."

In 2015 he was listed as number 22 of Politico 50 - a "Guide to the Thinkers, Doers and Visionaries Transforming American Politics".

== Education ==
Rieser graduated from Dartmouth College in 1976 and from Antioch School of Law, now the University of the District of Columbia David A. Clarke School of Law, in 1979.

== Political career ==
Rieser is a former public defender from Vermont. He has worked for Leahy since 1985. Since 1989 he has served as the Democratic Clerk for the Appropriations Subcommittee on State and Foreign Operations.

Rieser was one of the architects of a 1992 law with the International Campaign to Ban Landmines to ban the usage of landmines.

Rieser also helped draft the 1998 Leahy Law which bans the United States from providing military assistance to foreign armies that violate human rights without being held to account. In 2014, Guatemalan President Otto Pérez made international news by attacking Rieser publicly for aid restrictions.

Rieser was influential in opening U.S. policy toward Cuba and played a "significant role" in getting USAID contractor Alan Gross released from prison in Cuba.
