= Jean Camper Cahn =

American lawyer

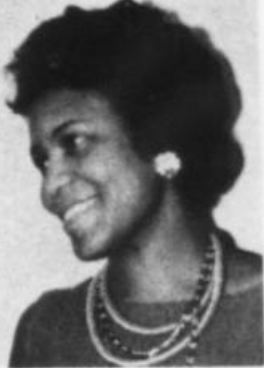
- Cahn, from a 1964 publication of the US Department of State
- Born: Jean Camper; May 26, 1935; Baltimore, Maryland, U.S.
- Died: January 2, 1991 (aged 55); Miami, Florida, U.S.
- Education: Swarthmore College (BA); Yale University (LLB)
- Occupations: Lawyer; educator; government official
- Spouse: Edgar S. Cahn (m. 1957)
- Children: 2

Jean Camper Cahn (May 26, 1935 – January 2, 1991) was an American lawyer and social activist who helped establish federal financing of legal services to the poor. Cahn was the first director of the National Legal Services Program in the O.E.O. and later founded the Urban Law Institute at George Washington University. In 1971, she co-founded the Antioch School of Law (now the David A. Clarke School of Law at the University of the District of Columbia) with her husband and law associate Edgar S. Cahn.

== Early life ==
Jean Camper was born on May 26, 1935, in Baltimore, Maryland. Her father, John Emory Toussaint Camper, was a civil rights activist and physician. Her mother, Florine Thompson, was a hairdresser. She grew up in Baltimore with her sister Elizabeth, and her two half-brothers and two half-sisters from her father's first marriage.

The Camper household was a regular meeting place for local NAACP figures and national civil rights leaders, such as Thurgood Marshall and her godfather Paul Robeson. Camper's father was known as "one of the most formidable men in black Baltimore." She would draw her inspiration from him, and from a series of personal incidents which would force her to confront racial injustice.

Camper was deeply affected when her younger brother, John Jr., suffering from a treatable ear infection, was refused treatment by Johns Hopkins University hospital because of his race. The hospital would eventually admit the boy, but only after the infection had spread, forcing doctors to remove part of his brain.

"They treated him like a monkey," Camper's mother would recall.

In 1950, Jean gained entrance into the prestigious Emma Willard School for Girls in New York on the recommendation of theologian Howard Thurman. Emma Willard would bring its own challenges: Many of the school's white students resisted her presence, some refusing to even live near her dormitory room. One girl told Jean that Jean's mother should be washing the floors of her house.

Other similar incidents served only to increase her fury at racial injustice. At a young age, "a good part of [Camper's] makeup got to be anger."

After graduating, Camper enrolled in Northwestern University, where she would live in an all-white student dormitory. While there, one of her friends enlisted Camper as a ghostwriter for a long-distance romance she was conducting. Jean would write the letters, her friend would copy them into her own hand, and then send them off to a boy at Swarthmore.

At the close of her first year, Camper was stricken with rheumatic fever and was forced to leave Northwestern to recuperate in Baltimore. When she recovered, she resumed her studies at Swarthmore College where she tracked down the recipient of her love letters: Her future husband, Edgar S. Cahn.

== Marriage and The War on Poverty ==
Jean and Edgar were married shortly after their graduation from Swarthmore. That same year she began her studies at Yale Law School, while her husband completed a PhD in English. He would also enroll at Yale Law School, finishing in 1963.

Jonathan, Jean's first child, was born the day of her first law school examination. Her second child, Reuben, was born while the couple was in England on a Fulbright fellowship.

Cahn earned her LLB in 1961, and the next year she and her husband were hired on a Ford Foundation grant to help run antipoverty programs in New Haven, Connecticut. She became associate general counsel for the New Haven Redevelopment Agency and staff attorney for the first neighborhood legal services program for the poor. The experience proved pivotal for Cahn herself as well as for the development of legal aid for the poor and for the course of President Lyndon Johnson's Great Society antipoverty programs.

Based on her experience in New Haven, Cahn and her husband authored their famed 1964 Yale Law Journal essay, "The War on Poverty: A Civilian Perspective" which would lead to the creation of the Legal Services Corporation, a federally funded program that remained true to Cahn's original vision to "promote equal access to justice in our Nation and to provide high quality civil legal assistance to low-income persons" (Legal Services Corporation).

The Cahns' insistence that the poor be guaranteed legal counsel in civil cases was indeed new and radical. The piece impressed a number of figures in the Lyndon Johnson administration, especially Sargent Shriver, head of the Office of Economic Opportunity (OEO).

In 1963 the couple moved to Washington, D.C., where Jean Cahn had taken a position at the African Desk at the State Department and her husband went to work for Attorney General Robert F. Kennedy.

Jean Cahn then was hired by Shriver, who gave her responsibility for setting up the legal services program. Cahn quickly secured approval from the American Bar Association (ABA), winning over the ABA president Lewis Powell. Powell's support helped convince the conservative association of the merits of Cahn's approach. The program not only provided legal services to people who would not have had access to the nation's courts but also created critical employment opportunities for minority lawyers. By 1967 the OEO was spending over $40 million on legal services for the poor.

However, Jean would become convinced that Shriver was abandoning the mission of legal services. Shriver too soon soured on Jean, preferring to place in her position a white male attorney who he felt would be better equipped to pitch the program to establishment lawyers.

Cahn resigned and denounced Shriver before a meeting of the ABA. Her husband however, declined to tender his resignation, arguing that his presence was necessary for the program's survival. This would strain their marriage almost to the breaking point. Tensions became overwhelming when Shriver compelled Edgar Cahn to draft a response to his wife's ABA attack.

"There should have been a divorce," Jean would later recall. "We should never have stayed married after that."

== After the OEO ==
In 1966 Jean Cahn helped found the federally funded Center for Community Action Education (CCAE), directed by former Congress of Racial Equality (CORE) national director James Farmer. The CCAE established literacy programs in churches, schools, and community centers. While working as an adjunct professor at Howard University from 1967 to 1971, Cahn organized the Institute for Political Services to Society, which studied the District of Columbia government's response to civilian grievances, and coupled the CCAE program to a new master's of law program in law and poverty at George Washington University.

=== Adam Clayton Powell Jr. ===
Also in 1967, Cahn joined the legal team that defended Representative Adam Clayton Powell Jr. against corruption charges before a congressional committee. She would argue his case before the U.S. Supreme Court to reverse Congress's vote to expel him.

=== The Urban Law Institute ===
The next year Cahn founded the Urban Law Institute (ULI) at George Washington University on an OEO grant, hiring law school students to serve as advocates for the District of Columbia's low-income residents. The ULI intended to "make the legal system and the rule of law itself relevant and responsive to the problems of the poor" (Waldman). It filed hundreds of lawsuits to halt bus fare increases, compel local television stations to hire African Americans, challenge slum lords, and make the District of Columbia's government more responsive. The ULI's high visibility caused consternation in the new Richard Nixon administration and at George Washington University, which became increasingly uneasy over Cahn's troublemaking clinical law program. Even the faculty voted to end support for the institute.

When Donald Rumsfeld (who had opposed the creation of the OEO as a congressman) took over direction of the program under President Nixon, Cahn's ULI was doomed. After nearly three years, the university decided that ULI's provocative work should go, prompting Cahn to declare, "Well, I'll just start my own damn law school" (Waldman).

== Antioch ==
The Cahns approached Antioch College in Yellow Springs, Ohio, to found the Antioch Law School in the District of Columbia. The new school would embody the ULI's clinical approach to instruction and its singular commitment to practicing poverty law.

The Washington Post enthusiastically supported the school, and Baltimore's U.S. representative Parren J. Mitchell exclaimed that the Antioch idea "means that given the courage and commitment of black folks, racism, apathy, bigotry, deceit, hypocrisy—all of these can be beaten into the ground" (Washington Post, 31 July 1971).

With the Cahns serving as co-deans—making Jean Cahn the first black female founder of a law school and the first black female dean of a law school—the enterprise began admitting an unprecedented number of women and minority students. The Cahns' ideal of "a law school organized around a teaching law firm" (Smith, 102) proved difficult to implement in practice. A demanding schedule and a requirement that students live with the poor to better understand their needs produced much unhappiness.

Facilities were outdated and faculty pay was low. Worse, accusations of chaotic rule destroyed faith in the Cahns. Despite this, in just one year, students at the school filed one thousand cases on behalf of the District of Columbia's poor, making Antioch Law School "the largest public-interest law firm in the country" (Waldman).

By 1977 the school was collapsing. Faculty members publicly rebuked the "chaos, turmoil and conflict they [the Cahns] have engendered . . . for five years" (Washington Post, 25 May 1977).

== Later life and death ==
In 1976 Cahn suffered a stroke that paralyzed much of her left side for over a year while leaving the burden of running the school on her husband.

Eventually, the Cahns had to mortgage their own house to pay the school's bills. Following a financial dispute between the Cahns and Antioch College, the school administration in Yellow Springs fired the couple in January 1980.

Jean remained in the District of Columbia, although her husband took a job at the University of Miami Law School. From 1984 to 1986 she served as a distinguished scholar at the London School of Economics and was distinguished visiting professor at Middlebury College.

The couple reunited, and in 1985 Cahn moved to Miami, where she began to practice law again. In 1989 she was diagnosed with cancer but continued to practice poverty law until her death in Miami.
