= Lori E. Varlotta =

American academic administrator

President of Antioch University
- Incumbent
- Assumed office August 2025
- Preceded by: William R. Groves

8th President of California Lutheran University
- In office September 2020 – May 2024
- Preceded by: Chris Kimball
- Succeeded by: John Nunes

22nd President of Hiram College
- In office 2014–2020

Personal details
- Education: University of Notre Dame (BA); Syracuse University (MS); Miami University (PhD)

Lori E. Varlotta is an American academic administrator who since 2025 has served as the president of Antioch University. She previously served as president of Hiram College (2014–2020) and California Lutheran University (2020–2024).

== Early life and education ==
Varlotta was born and raised in Pittsburgh, Pennsylvania. A first-generation college student, she earned a Bachelor of Arts in philosophy from the University of Notre Dame, a Master of Science in cultural foundations of education from Syracuse University, and PhD in educational leadership and feminist philosophy from Miami University.

== Career ==
Earlier in her career, she served in mid-level roles at Miami University (OH), the University of Pittsburgh at Bradford, and Syracuse University. She held other senior leadership roles at the University of Wisconsin–Whitewater and the University of San Francisco.

Before her presidencies, Varlotta spent 11 years at California State University, Sacramento, ultimately serving as senior vice president of planning, enrollment management, and student affairs.

Varlotta’s was president of Hiram College from 2014 to 2020, serving as the institution’s 22nd president.

Varlotta left Hiram to serve as president of California Lutheran University, a private Hispanic-Serving Institution. She worked there from September 2020 to May 2024.

Varlotta arrived at Cal Lutheran at the height of the global pandemic, at a time when the university was facing its first budget deficit and enrollment shortfall in decades. In that same year, the university was dealing with major legal issues. It was being sued by some of its own students and employees and was also warned of a forthcoming lawsuit by former U.S. congressman Elton Gallegly who was upset with the way the university was handling his archival materials.

Varlotta resigned from the presidency at California Lutheran University "four months after a lopsided faculty vote of no confidence in her leadership." The faculty "resolution ― approved by a 122-3 faculty vote ― decried Varlotta's handling of university finances and said the third-year president has 'eroded and divided' the university's 'historically close' community."

=== Antioch University ===
Varlotta was named the 23rd president of Antioch University in May 2025. She assumed office on August 11, 2025, succeeding William R. Groves. Varlotta oversees the university's operations across its four campuses, namely Antioch University Los Angeles and Antioch University Santa Barbara in California, Antioch University New England in Keene, New Hampshire, and Antioch University Seattle in the state of Washington.

Concurrently, Varlotta serves as the Executive Vice President of the Coalition for the Common Good (CCG). Established in 2023 by Antioch University and Otterbein University, the CCG is a higher education system designed to affiliate private universities around a shared mission of democracy and social justice. Upon beginning her tenure, Varlotta toured the university's campuses to assess institutional needs.

In summer 2026, John Comerford, President of the Coalition for the Common Good attempted to terminate her employment as President of Antioch University. However, as of October 2026, she remains listed as president on Antioch's website, which claims that the Coalition for the Common Good lacks the ability to take such an action.

== Professional service ==
Varlotta has been involved in the Association of Public and Land-grant Universities' Voluntary System of Accountability, the National Advisory Board for the Mandel Humanities Center at Cuyahoga Community College, the National Advisory Board for the National Survey of Student Engagement, and the American Council on Education’s (ACE) National Task Force on the Transfer and Award of Credit. She also serves on the National Association of Independent Colleges and Universities’ (NAICU) Policy and Advocacy Committee.

Varlotta has written and spoken about the role of the liberal arts in the 21st century, technology’s place in the classroom, the college return on investment, the concept of the glass cliff, and academic restructuring.
