= Original Congregational Church of Wrentham =

Historic church in Massachusetts, United States

- U.S. National Register of Historic Places
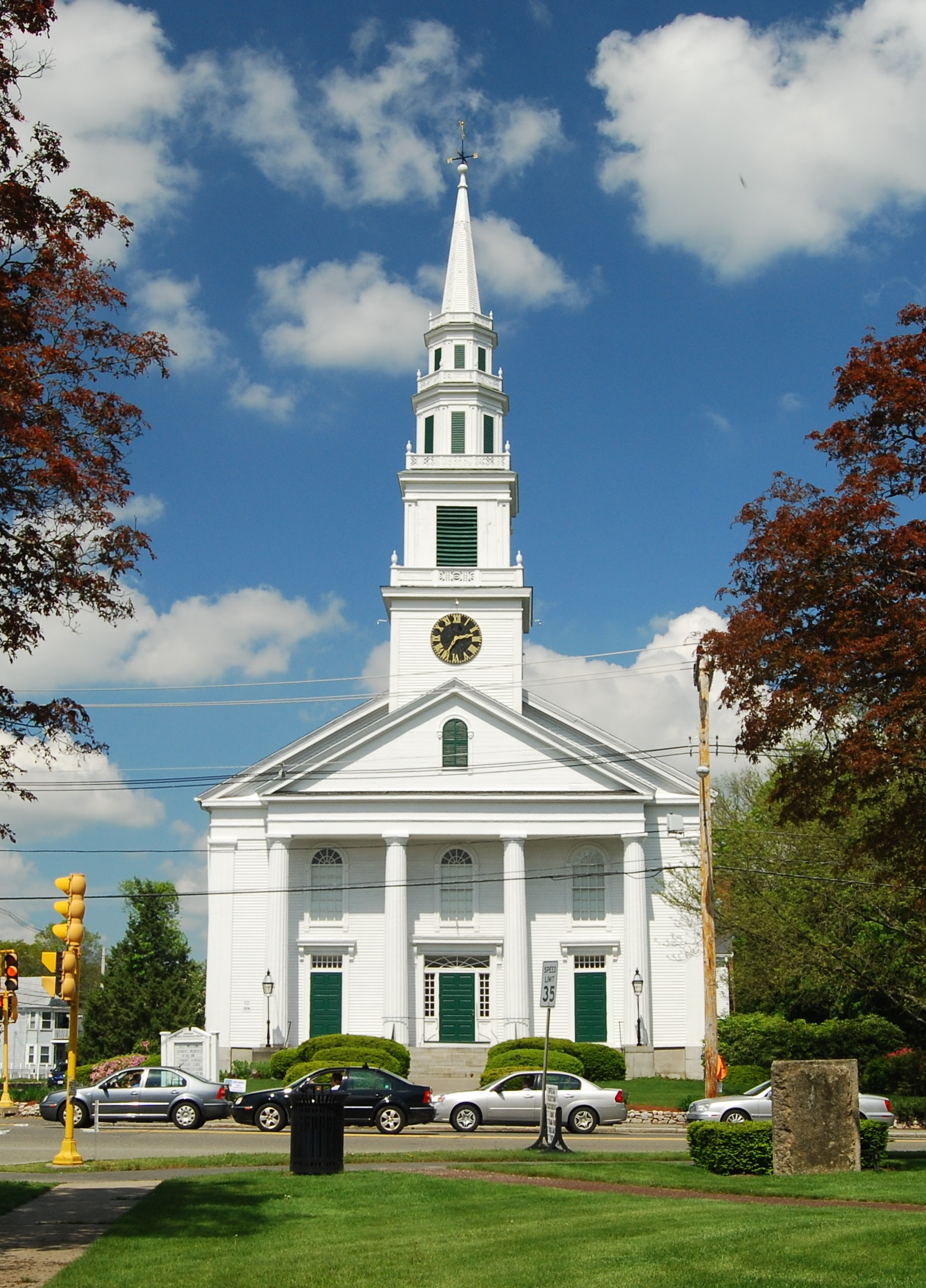

- Location within Massachusetts Location within the United States
- Location: 1 East and 22 Dedham Streets, Wrentham, Massachusetts
- Coordinates: 42°4′1″N 71°19′39″W
- Built: 1834
- Architectural style: Greek Revival
- NRHP reference No.: 14000694
- Added to NRHP: September 22, 2014

The Original Congregational Church of Wrentham is a historic church in Wrentham, Massachusetts. The present church is a Greek Revival structure built in 1834 for a congregation (Wrentham's first) formed in 1692. The church, which occupies a prominent position in the center of Wrentham, has a four-stage tower (rebuilt after the New England Hurricane of 1938), and a tetrastyle Doric portico. The building underwent a modernizing renovation in 1878, at which time many of the windows were modified to have rounded tops; many of these changes were reversed during renovations in the 1950s.

The church building was listed the National Register of Historic Places in 2014.

The early church records burned in the house of its first minister, Samuel Man, on October 26, 1699.

== See also ==
- National Register of Historic Places listings in Norfolk County, Massachusetts
