= Samuel Man =

Early teacher in Dedham, Massachusetts and minister in Wrentham, Massachusetts

Samuel Man (July 6, 1647 – May 22, 1719) was an early teacher in Dedham, Massachusetts, and minister in Wrentham, Massachusetts.

== Personal life ==
Man was born on July 6, 1647, to William Man and Mary, née Jarrad, of Cambridge, Massachusetts. Man was an only child and his parents designated their son for the ministry from an early age. He married Esther Ware, the granddaughter of John Hunting, on May 13, 1673, and they had seven sons and four daughters. He was graduated from Harvard College in 1665. He was the great-grandfather of Horace Mann and a descendant of John Man. He died on May 22, 1719 and his funeral sermon was later published.

== Dedham ==
While living in Dedham, Man was hired to teach in the Dedham Public Schools on May 13, 1667, at a salary of £10 a year. He continued in that position until 1672 when he was required to give two months notice before he moved to Wollomonopoag.

== Wrentham ==
Man moved from Dedham to the area soon to be known as Wrentham in 1672, one year after the first settlers arrived. He preached to the settlers there until he was called away to fight in King Phillip's War. Each resident was required to pay one shilling and one sixpence per common right to pay Man's salary. His selection as minister seems to have been an easy decision. He was selected by the residents of Wollomonopoag and their decision was quickly ratified by a committee of John Allin, John Hunting, and Eleazer Lusher. After Wrentham was burned to the ground, he returned to Dedham and taught there again from 1676 to 1678.

He was made a freeman in 1678. In the spring of 1678 he turned down an opportunity to be ordained in Milton and to preach for the winter in Rehoboth, though he lived and preached in Milton for four years. When the people of Wrentham heard that he was about to be called to Milton, they sent a committee to entice him to return and be their minister. He returned on August 26, 1680. Due to the "troublous times and divers hinderances," it was not until April 13, 1692, that a church of 10 people was gathered in Wrentham with Man ordained as the pastor.

His ordination was attended by Judge Samuel Sewall and he preached from 1st Corinthians IV Chapter 2nd verse. He would minister there for the next 49 years and his last sermon was preached on March 1, 1719, from Ecclesiastes 1st chap 14th verse.

His house burned, along with the church records, on October 26, 1699.

== Works cited ==
- Hanson, Robert Brand (1976). Dedham, Massachusetts, 1635-1890. Dedham Historical Society.
- Fiore, Jordan D. (1973). Wrentham, 1673-1973: A History. Town of Wrentham. May be obtained at the Fiske Public Library.
- Blake, Mortimer (1879). A History of the Town of Franklin, Mass: From Its Settlement to the Completion of Its First Century, 2d March, 1878 : with Genealogical Notices of Its Earliest Families, Sketches of Its Professional Men, and a Report of the Centennial Celebration. Higginson Book Company.
