= Benjamin Pickman Mann =

American naturalist (1848–1926)

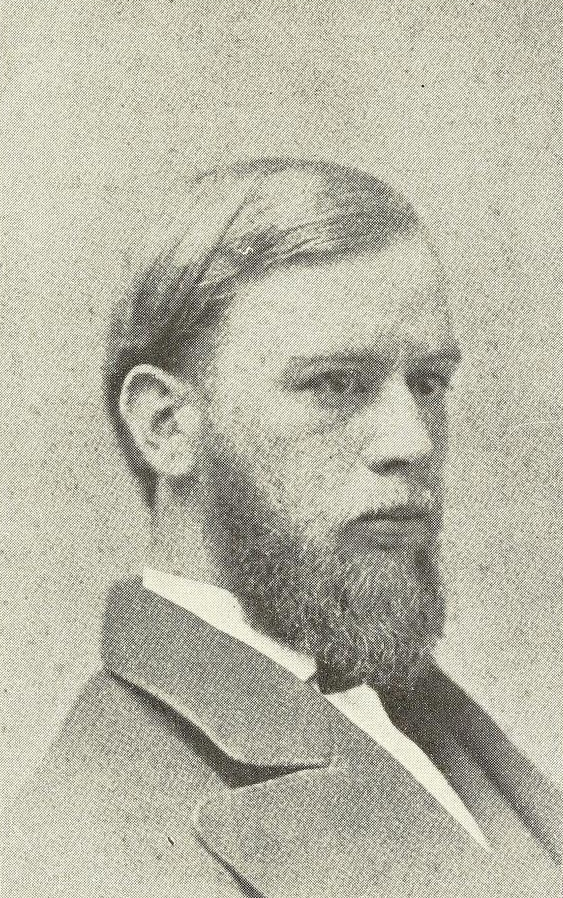

Benjamin Pickman Mann (April 30, 1848 – March 22, 1926) was an American entomologist, botanist, and teacher. A founding member of the Cambridge Entomological Club, he was involved in compiling bibliographies of American entomology.

Mann was born in West Newton, Massachusetts, the son of Horace Mann and Mary T. Peabody. He graduated from Harvard College in 1870 and lived in Cambridge where he was a founding member of the Cambridge Entomological Club. In the early years, meetings of the club were held at his home. In 1881 he joined US Department of Agriculture at Washington, D.C., in the entomological bureau and became a patent examiner in 1887. He served as an editor for the journal Psyche: A Journal of Entomology and was involved in indexing and classifying entomological publications. He also examined the use of the Dewey decimal system in zoology. He was also active in children's education, Esperanto language, and taxation reform. His wife Louisa Van de Sande Mann was a member of the Colored Home Association (1882–1894) and in 1863 he served as the first teacher at the Coloured Home.

The standard author abbreviation B.Mann is used to indicate this person as the author when citing a botanical name.
