= Laraine Herring =

American writer (born 1968)

- Born: August 5, 1968 (age 58); Charlotte, North Carolina, United States
- Education: University of Arizona (BA), Antioch University (MFA), Prescott College (MA)
- Occupations: Novelist; poet; essayist; professor
- Writing career
- Genres: historical fiction, literary fiction, creative nonfiction
- Subjects: social justice, feminism, writing
- Notable work: Writing Begins with the Breath
- Website: laraineherring.com

Laraine Herring (born 1968) is an American writer of both novels and nonfiction books. Herring's poetry, fiction, and essays have appeared in various anthologies and magazines, including Midnight Mind and Walking the Twilight: Women Writers of the Southwest. She was awarded the Barbara Deming Memorial Fund grant for her fiction, and her non-fiction has been nominated for a Pushcart Prize.

== Early life and education ==
Herring holds a BA from the University of Arizona, an MFA in Creative Writing/Fiction from Antioch University, and an MA in Counseling Psychology from Prescott College.

== Career ==
Herring was listed in the Arizona Artists Roster in Creative Writing from 2001 to 2010. She has taught at universities, libraries, community centers, and writing conferences around the country, as well as at the Kripalu Center for Yoga and Health and Omega Institute for Holistic Studies.

Herring was writer in residence at Soapstone Retreat in 2003.

She was a presenter at Hassayampa Institute for Creative Writing from 2005 to 2007. She was a Phoenix College Creative Writing Microburst Panelist in 2006, and writer in residence at Eastern Arizona College in 2008.

Currently, she directs the Creative Writing Program at Yavapai College in Prescott, Arizona, and works as a consultant for Tracking Wonder in New York.

== Books ==
- Monsoons: A Collection of Writing (1999) (ISBN 978-1892579065), Duality Press
- Lost Fathers: How Women Can Heal from Adolescent Father Loss (2005) (ISBN 978-1592851553), Hazelden Press
- Writing Begins with the Breath: Embodying Your Authentic Voice (2007) (ISBN 978-1590304730), Shambhala Publications
- The Writing Warrior: Discovering the Courage to Free Your True Voice (2010) (ISBN 978-1590307960), Shambhala Publications
- Ghost Swamp Blues: A Novel (2010) (ISBN 978-1935052272), White River Press
- Into the Garden of Gethsemane, Georgia (2013) ISBN 978-0985260750, The Concentrium
- Gathering Lights: A Novel of San Francisco (2013) ISBN 978-0985260774, The Concentrium
- On Being Stuck: Tapping into the Creative Power of Writer's Block (2016) Shambhala Publications
- A Constellation of Ghosts: A Speculative Memoir (2021) Regal House Publishing ISBN 9781646030804

== Anthologies ==
Laraine Herring's work has appeared in the following Anthologies:

- Walking the Twilight: Women Writers of the Southwest, (ISBN 978-0873585859), Northland Publications
- Women Celebrate (ISBN 978-0974399805) Peace Publications

== Productions ==
Laraine Herring's work has been featured in the following Productions:

- She Rhythms (contributing author) produced by Big Damn Deal Productions
- Hosanna in the Highest produced by Big Damn Deal Productions
- Witch Holiday produced by Planet Earth Multicultural Theatre
- Earthquakes (contributing author) – Public Cable Access, award-winning program
- A Sick & Twisted Christmas (contributing author) produced by Planet Earth Theatre
- Nothing's Black & White But Zebras produced by Planet Earth Multicultural Theatre
- Liberating Mama produced by Planet Earth Multicultural Theatre
- The Resurrection Quilt produced by Playwright's Workshop Theatre
- Voices on the Edge (contributing author) produced by Playwright's Workshop Theatre (Zony nomination, Best Original Work)
- Over the Edge (contributing author) produced by Playwright's Workshop Theatre

== Honors ==
- 2001: Barbara Deming Award for Women Grant for fiction
- 2002: i.e. magazine, 1st prize, short fiction
- 2002: Pushcart Prize nomination, creative non-fiction piece appearing in “Midnight Mind”
- 2003: Tempe Poetry
- Phoenix Downtown Magazine, first prize, poetry
