= Anil Singh (judge) =

American judge

Anil C. Singh

Associate Justice, Appellate Division, First Judicial Department, New York Supreme Court
- Incumbent
- Assumed office 2017
- Appointed by: Governor Andrew Cuomo

Justice, New York Supreme Court (elected 2013)
- In office 2014–2017

Judge, New York City Civil Court (elected 2002)
- In office 2002–2013

Personal details
- Born: 1958 (age 67–68) Gazipur, Uttar Pradesh, India
- Education: Lawrence University (B.A. 1980); Antioch School of Law (J.D. 1986)

Anil C. Singh is a retired American judge who served in New York's state courts for over 20 years. He won elections for judicial office in the New York City Civil Court and in the New York County (Manhattan) Supreme Court, where he served as a business court judge in the Commercial Division (2015 to 2017). Singh emigrated from Gazipur, India to the United States at the age of 18. In 2017, Governor Andrew Cuomo made Singh the first person of South Asian origin to sit on a New York state appellate court when Cuomo appointed Singh to the New York Supreme Court's Appellate Division. Singh was the first Asian American to serve on New York's Commission on Judicial Conduct.

== Early life and education ==
Singh was born in Gazipur, India in 1958, and emigrated to the United States from India in 1976, at the age of 18. Singh received his Bachelor of Arts degree from Lawrence University in 1980, and his Juris Doctor degree from Antioch School of Law in 1986.

== Legal practice ==
After graduating from law school, in 1987, Singh became the principal court attorney to New York Civil Court judge Alice Schlesinger. Singh continued in that role with Schlesinger when she later was elected to the Supreme Court, serving until his 2002 election to New York's Civil Court.

== Judicial service ==
Singh was elected to the New York City Civil Court in 2002, and re-elected in 2012. In 2013, he was elected as a justice to the New York Supreme Court, beginning service in 2014. In 2010, Chief Administrative Judge Ann Pfau had appointed Singh to serve as an acting Supreme Court justice. As a Supreme Court justice, among other positions, he served as a presiding justice in the Mortgage Foreclosure Settlement Part.

In 2015, Singh was appointed to the Supreme Court's Commercial Division, a specialized business court docket focusing on disputes of a business or commercial nature. Commercial Division judges preside over an assigned case from beginning to end. "The caseload of the Division is ... very demanding, requiring of the court scholarship in commercial law, experience in the management of complex cases, and a wealth of energy".

In 2017, Governor Andrew Cuomo appointed Singh to the New York State Supreme Court, Appellate Division, First Department, which has appellate jurisdiction over the counties of New York (Manhattan) and the Bronx. He was the first South Asian person to become an appellate state court judge in New York. In 2023, he was selected by New York Chief Judge Rowan D. Wilson to serve on New York's Commission on Judicial Conduct, which reviews complaints of ethical misconduct against New York state judges and justices. Singh became the first Asian American to serve on the commission. Prior to that appointment Singh served on the Advisory Committee on Judicial Ethics, where he provided ethics advice to judges, justices, and quasi-judicial officials through advisory opinions.

In 2023, Singh was elevated by Governor Kathy Hochul to serve on the Appellate Division's constitutional bench, to fill a vacancy created by the elevation of justice Dianne Renwick to Presiding Justice of the First Department of the Appellate Division. Singh retired from the appellate court in 2025, and began work as an arbitrator, mediator, and court-appointed neutral for JAMS.

In a 2019 case, Singh wrote the legal opinion for the Appellate Division in a case involving disputed claims over artwork stolen by the Nazis during World War II. In response to the argument that the original owner had signed a power of attorney while in a Nazi death camp giving that person the legal authority to transfer ownership, Singh wrote "'We reject the notion that a person who signs a power of attorney in a death camp can be said to have executed the document voluntarily . . . Any subsequent transfer of the artworks did not convey legal title'".
