= Antioch University Santa Barbara =

Private university in Santa Barbara, California

Coordinates: 34.41923°N 119.69579°W

- Type: Private
- Established: 1977
- President: Lori E. Varlotta
- Provost: Barbara Lipinski, PhD, JD
- Faculty: 117
- Students: under 400
- Location: Santa Barbara, California, United States
- Campus: urban
- Website: www.antioch.edu/santa-barbara

Antioch University Santa Barbara (AUSB) is a private liberal arts university in downtown Santa Barbara, California. It is part of the Antioch University system that includes campuses in Keene, New Hampshire; Seattle, Washington; Los Angeles, California; and Yellow Springs, Ohio, also home to Antioch College. Antioch University has operated in Santa Barbara since 1977.

== History ==
Antioch College was established in 1852 in Yellow Springs, Ohio. Horace Mann, educator, social reformer, abolitionist, and one of the creators of the US public school system was its first president. Mann's goal, which he achieved, was to create a university that would be nonsectarian, coeducational, and that did not utilize a conventional grading system. In 1863, Antioch approved a policy that no applicant was to be rejected on the basis of race. It was also among the first colleges to offer the same curriculum to men and women students.

In 1963 the College began to expand out-of-state. A network of schools was begun. In 1977 Antioch College renamed itself Antioch University and opened the Santa Barbara campus that year.

== Programs ==
AUSB's programs include:

Bachelor of Arts (BA) in Liberal Studies has seven concentrations available: Applied Psychology; Business & Entrepreneurship; Child Development & Education; Communication & Media; Environmental Studies; Liberal Arts; and Marketing.

Master of Fine Arts (MFA) in Writing & Contemporary Media

Master of Business Administration (MBA) program in Social Business, Non-Profit Management, and Strategic Leadership

Master of Arts in Education (MA) or the more streamlined Master of Education (MEd) There are additional course work offerings, including a Teacher Credential Program, a Multiple-Subject Teaching Credential, a Social Justice and Educational Leadership Emphasis, a Nature-Based Childhood Education Emphasis, an Educational Specialist Mild/Moderate Credential, and an Educational Specialist Mild/Moderate Curriculum Design.

Master of Arts (MA) in Clinical Psychology prepares students for MFT or LPCC licensure. Optional concentrations: Healthy Aging or Latino Mental Health.

Doctor of Clinical Psychology (PsyD)

Women & Leadership Certificate program

== Students ==
Students are primarily adults who are either returning to school or who are planning for career change. University policy states that it seeks "qualified candidates who will contribute to building a student body diverse in gender, ethnicity, age, class, physical differences, learning styles, sexual orientation, professional backgrounds, and community experiences." The University partners with AmeriCorps by matching up to $5,000 with its Segal Education Scholarship for service as an AmeriCorps graduate. The university caters to an increasing number of international students.
