= Antioch University Seattle =

Private, non-profit liberal arts university founded 1975

- Former name: Antioch College
- Type: Private, nonprofit liberal arts university
- Established: 1852
- Parent institution: Antioch University
- President: Lori E. Varlotta
- Provost: Sandra Madar
- Total staff: 136
- Students: 799
- Undergraduates: 80
- Location: Seattle, Washington, United States; 47°36′58″N 122°20′47″W
- Language: English
- Website: https://www.antioch.edu/seattle/

Antioch University Seattle (AUS) is a private, nonprofit liberal arts university founded in 1975 and located in Seattle, Washington. It is part of the Antioch University system that includes campuses in Keene, New Hampshire; Santa Barbara, California; Los Angeles, California; and Yellow Springs, Ohio, also home to Antioch College.

== History ==
Antioch College was established in 1852 in Yellow Springs, Ohio. Horace Mann, educator, social reformer, abolitionist, and one of the creators of the US public school system was its first president. Mann's goal, which he achieved, was to create a university that would be nonsectarian, coeducational, and that did not utilize a conventional grading system. In 1863, Antioch approved a policy that no applicant was to be rejected on the basis of race. It was also among the first colleges to offer the same curriculum to men and women students.

In 1963 the college began to expand out-of-state. A network of schools was begun. In 1977 Antioch College renamed itself Antioch University. The Seattle location opened at The Center School in Fremont in 1975. The college moved to its own two-story building in the Denny Triangle in 1996, which was later sold in 2015. Antioch Seattle opened its new campus on January 3, 2017, in nearby Belltown.

== Programs ==
AUS offers master's degrees, a B.A. completion program and a Doctor of Clinical Psychology (Psy. D.). Between 800 and 1000 students attend Antioch, with an average age of 35. The School of Applied Psychology, Counseling and Family Therapy is the largest and longest running program with close to 3,000 graduates since 1976. The School offers master's degrees in mental health counseling, integrative studies, child, couple and family therapy, art therapy and drama therapy in addition to the Psy. D. program. The Center for Programs in Education offers teacher preparation at the graduate level, plus a master's in education for experienced educators. The B.A. in Liberal Studies program attracts students who like an individualized approach to completing their undergraduate degree. Students can receive credit for life experience and may pursue subjects of particular interest to them.
