= Rebecca Pennell (educator) =

American educator

Rebecca Mann Pennell, later Rebecca Mann Dean (1821–1890) was an American educator, niece of prominent educator Horace Mann, and the first woman to be appointed a full faculty member at an American college. She was one of the ten founding professors of Antioch College in Yellow Springs, Ohio, where she taught physical geography, drawing, natural history, civil history, and didactics. Pennell was the first female college professor who received the same rank and pay as her male colleagues and attended faculty meetings. Part of Pennell's salary was a home on campus, which still stands and is named for Pennell, as is a hall in one of Antioch College's dormitory buildings.
