= Antioch University Los Angeles =

Campus of Antioch University in Culver City, California

- Type: Private Non-Profit
- Established: 1972
- Parent institution: Antioch University
- President: Lori E. Varlotta
- Provost: Sandra Madar
- Students: 1200 approx
- Location: Culver City, California, United States
- Website: www.antioch.edu/los-angeles

Antioch University Los Angeles (AULA) is a campus of Antioch University in Culver City, California.

== History ==
Antioch University Los Angeles is one of the five campuses of Antioch University.

Antioch College was founded in Yellow Springs, Ohio in 1852. Horace Mann, Antioch College's first president's goal was to create an educational environment that was stimulating and unconventional in its approach to learning.

Antioch evolved from a small liberal arts college to a multi-campus university system with four campuses located across the nation in Keene, New Hampshire, Seattle, Washington, Santa Barbara, California and Los Angeles, California. The Antioch University system and Antioch College are no longer affiliated in any way.

Antioch University Los Angeles was established in 1972, with just 12 students.

The campus is located in Culver City, within the Greater Los Angeles area, approximately where the 405 and 90 freeways cross. There are currently about 1,200 students enrolled.

== Academics ==
The University offers undergraduate degree completion programs in Liberal Studies, Applied Studies, Applied Arts and Media, Urban Communities and Justice, and Applied Technology and Business Leadership, and graduate programs in Nonprofit Management, Education and Teacher Credentialing, Psychology, Creative Writing, and Urban Sustainability. Antioch University is accredited by the Higher Learning Commission (HLC).

== Social support ==
- The Bridge Program offers a year of humanities education for college credit at no cost to students. It provides free university classes for adults who have not have otherwise has access to higher education including tuition, textbooks, instruction, tutoring, transportation, and meals during class for all Bridge students. The program, formerly called the CHE Program (Community Humanities Education) began in 1999 and was founded by David Tripp and Shari Foos. The Bridge Program was inspired by the Clemente Course at Bard College, which similarly provided free classes to economically disadvantaged students who might not otherwise be able to attend college.
- The low-residency Master of Arts in Urban Sustainability Program is training the next generation of urban problem-solvers to meet the world's dual challenges of climate change and inequality. Graduates are leading the public and private sector making positive change.
- The Horace Mann Upstanders Award, sponsored by the Education Department, honors work that promotes social action in children's literature.
- AULA's graduate-level LGBT Psychology Specialization (the first of its kind) founded Colors LGBTQ Youth Counseling Center. Colors provides free lesbian, gay, bisexual and transgender-affirmative counseling to young adults. The LGBT Specialization was featured in an article in the NY Times on the need for LGBT psychology.
- The low-residency Master of Fine Arts in Creative Writing, which requires the inclusion of social justice in students' work, is repeatedly ranked in the top 10 in the nation by Poets & Writers magazine. The MFA Program's Poetry Genre and was featured on PBS NewsHour.
