= Chris Kimball =

Chris Kimball (born August 31, 1955) is a former president and chief executive officer at California Lutheran University from April 2008 to August 2020. Before his tenure at CLU, he served as Provost and Vice President of Academic Affairs at CLU from 2006 to 2008. Previously, he had served as Dean of the Faculty and Provost at Augsburg College in Minneapolis, Minnesota. An alumnus of McGill University in Canada, Kimball received his doctorate from the University of Chicago. Kimball constructed and taught a baseball class at Augsburg College, and has also taught the course "U.S. History Through Baseball" while President of Cal Lutheran.

Kimball, who was a history professor at the University of Nebraska–Lincoln from 1989 to 1991, is also an author and a public speaker on academic affairs. His scholarly work concentrates on American history, specializing in sports history and social history. He was the chief architect of a new strategic plan at CLU, approved by the board in February 2008. The plan focused on attracting and retaining high-quality faculty, student body, and staff, and also investing in facilities and programs such as the $8.5 million Swenson Center for Academic Excellence. Kimball and his family are members of Holy Trinity Lutheran Church in Thousand Oaks.

On October 15, 2019, in an email to university faculty, staff, and students, Kimball announced his intention to not extend his contract beyond the end of the 2019–20 school year. Kimball stated that his decision to leave the university presidency was out of a desire to "return to teaching, as I had always planned, and to spend time on writing projects, some long overdue".
