= Antioch University =

Private university in the United States

Coordinates: 39°48′12.6″N 83°54′25.8″W

- Type: Private university
- Established: 1852; first adult campus 1964
- Chancellor: William R. Groves
- President: Lori E. Varlotta
- Location: Yellow Springs, Ohio, United States
- Website: antioch.edu

Coalition for the Common Good, doing business as Antioch University, is a private university with multiple campuses in the United States and online programs. It is the continuation of Antioch College, which was founded in 1852. Antioch College's first president was the politician, abolitionist, and education reformer Horace Mann. In 1977, the college network was re-incorporated as Antioch University to reflect its growth across the country into numerous graduate education programs. It operates five campuses located in four states, as well as a number online and low-residency programs. All campuses of the university are regionally accredited by the Higher Learning Commission.

The university administration is headquartered in Yellow Springs, Ohio, and it has five campuses located in Los Angeles and Santa Barbara, California; Keene, New Hampshire; and Seattle, Washington. Antioch University suspended operations of Antioch College in 2008 and later sold the campus and a license to use the name "Antioch College" in 2009. Since then, the college has had no affiliation with the university.

== History ==
=== 19th century ===
Antioch College was incorporated in Ohio in 1852 and accredited by the Higher Learning Commission in 1927.

From its inception, racial and gender equality, independent study, and independent thinking were integral parts of Antioch College. Six students were accepted for the first quarter: four men and two women who came to share the same college classrooms for the first time in the U.S. The notion of gender equality extended also to the faculty. Antioch College was the first U.S. college to designate a woman as full professor, and the original faculty included seven men and two women. In 1863, the college instituted the policy that no applicant was to be rejected on the basis of race.

Antioch College's first president was Horace Mann, regarded by most historians as the father of public education in the United States.

=== 20th century ===
In 1977, the Antioch College board of trustees voted to change its corporate name to Antioch University, having extended its operations beyond the college and beyond Ohio, mostly in graduate level programs. It continued to operate Antioch College as a division of the university along with the other campuses and centers. From 1978 to 1994, the president of the Antioch College campus also served as the chancellor of Antioch University.

=== Split with Antioch College ===
In 2007, the Antioch University board of trustees announced that they would suspend operations of Antioch College the following year due to financial exigency and that they intended to re-open the college in four years. It was their belief that four years would give the university the necessary time to develop and execute a plan for rebuilding Antioch College in a manner that would both honor its legacy and secure its future.

There was considerable controversy among members of the Antioch College alumni group about the decision to suspend operations at the college. Subsequently, a group of Antioch College alumni, headed by the Antioch College Alumni Board, expressed interest in purchasing the college from the university and re-opening the college as an independent institution. The alumni group formed a new Ohio corporation, Antioch College Continuation Corporation, as the vehicle for negotiating and owning the college.

After two years of negotiations, the parties agreed to terms of an asset purchase agreement which was signed at a closing ceremony on September 4, 2009. In the transaction, Antioch College Continuation Corporation purchased from the university the college campus in Yellow Springs, Ohio, along with an exclusive license to use the university's registered trade name "Antioch College". The new independent Antioch College opened in 2011. Since then, Antioch University and Antioch College have operated as wholly separate, non-affiliated institutions, while. However, Antioch University continues to own the trade name and any other use of the word "Antioch" within higher education.

In 2010, the college was sanctioned by the American Association of University Professors "for infringement of governance standards".

=== Coalition for the Common Good ===
Antioch University and Otterbein University came together in 2023 to create an umbrella organization called the Coalition for the Common Good (“CCG”). The arrangement was not viewed as a merger, but instead as a business alliance intended to benefit both parties, and perhaps sweep in additional institutions in the future. CCG became the official parent of both colleges, but subject to each institution retaining a certain amount of autonomy.

In August, 2026, Antioch's Board of Governors filed suit against CCG, alleging CCG was attempting a “hostile takeover” of the university in violation of the CCG by-laws. In September 2026, they faced a legal setback when an Ohio court denied a request for a preliminary injunction to stop the plan to remove Antioch's Board of Governors and its president Lori Varlotta.

== Campuses ==
=== Antioch University Graduate School of Leadership and Change ===
The Antioch University Graduate School of Leadership and Change (GSLC) was officially established in 2015, but has its roots in the university's PhD in Leadership and Change offered since 2002. The school has approximately 168 active students.

=== Antioch University Los Angeles ===
Antioch University Los Angeles, also known as AULA, was founded in 1972. The school is actually located in Culver City, California, having moved from prior locations in West Hollywood, on Rose Avenue in Venice, and on Fiji Way in Marina del Rey. AULA had 924 students as of 2020, with most students being post-baccalaureate and at least 40 percent of undergraduates being enrolled part-time.

=== Antioch University New England ===
Though founded as Antioch Putney Graduate School in 1964, Antioch University New England has been located at its present campus in Keene, New Hampshire, since 1994. There were 895 students enrolled as of 2020, and this campus is exclusively graduate. All 11 graduate programs are all on-campus only, with none being offered online. 32% of students are part time.

=== Antioch University Online ===
While called a separate "campus" by the university, the school is 100% online with no on-campus learning required. The online school has over 100 students, and offers both bachelors and masters level programs.

=== Antioch University Santa Barbara ===
Antioch University Santa Barbara, also known as AUSB, had 276 students as of 2020, with most being post-baccalaureate and at least 40 percent of undergraduates being enrolled part-time. It was founded in 1977. About 99% are under 25, and about 97% are in-state residents.

=== Antioch University Seattle ===
Founded in 1975, moved to 6th Avenue in Seattle, and later moved to 2400 3rd Avenue in Downtown Seattle, Antioch University Seattle had 735 students as of 2020, with most students being post-baccalaureate and at least 40 percent of undergraduates being enrolled part-time.

== Former campus ==
=== Antioch University Midwest ===
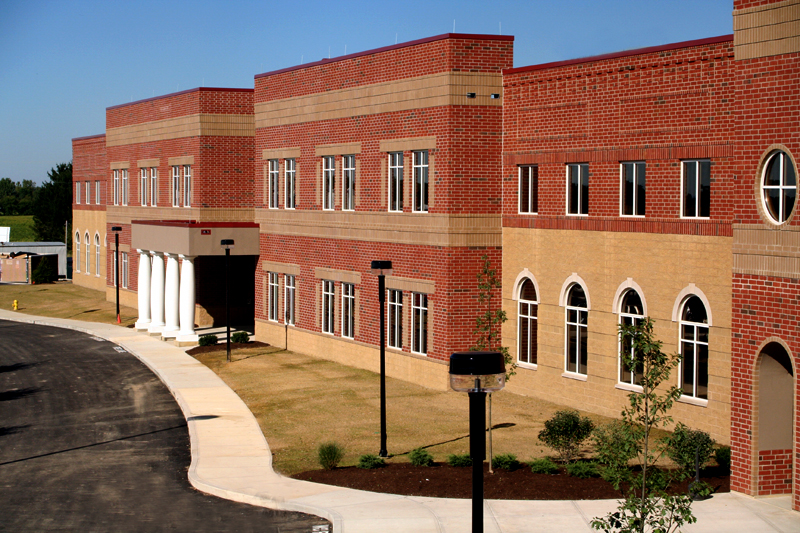
Antioch University Midwest

Antioch University Midwest (AUM) was located in Yellow Springs, Ohio. Antioch University Midwest was known as Antioch University McGregor and founded in 1988 as the School of Adult and Experiential Learning at Antioch College.

Yellow Springs was the home campus for many of the university's low-residency programs, which attract students from across the country, including its PhD in Leadership and Change, its EdD in Education and Professional Practice, and its master's degree in Clinical Mental Health Counseling. AUM's functions were absorbed into AU Online, and its building put up for sale. However, university administration, AU Online and AU's Graduate School of Leadership & Change remained headquartered in Yellow Springs, leaving about 25 employees.

== Notable alumni ==
- Judy Lewis
- Christy Sheffield Sanford
- Margaret Sloan-Hunter
- Reyna Grande
- Laraine Herring
- José Ramos-Horta
