= Horace Mann =

American educational reformer (1796–1859)

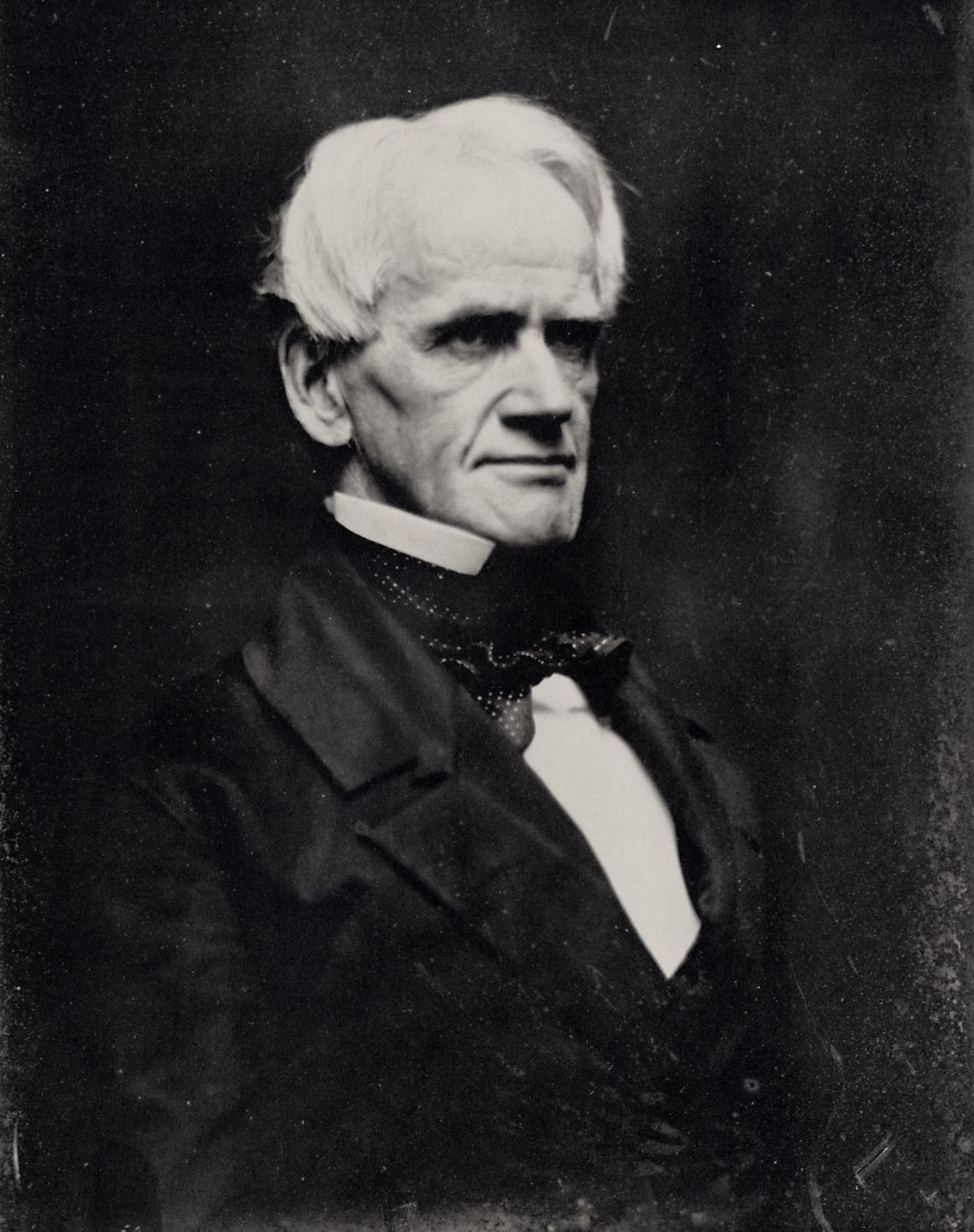
- Mann, c. 1851

Member of the U.S. House of Representatives from Massachusetts's 8th district
- In office April 3, 1848 – March 3, 1853
- Preceded by: John Quincy Adams
- Succeeded by: Tappan Wentworth

1st Secretary of the Massachusetts Board of Education
- In office 1837–1848
- Preceded by: Office established
- Succeeded by: Barnas Sears

Personal details
- Born: May 4, 1796 Franklin, Massachusetts, U.S.
- Died: August 2, 1859 (aged 63) Yellow Springs, Ohio, U.S.
- Resting place: North Burial Ground, Providence, Rhode Island, U.S.
- Party: Whig
- Spouses: Charlotte Messer Mann (d. 1832); Mary Peabody Mann
- Children: 3
- Education: Brown University; Litchfield Law School
- Occupation: Lawyer; Educator; College president

Horace Mann (May 4, 1796 – August 2, 1859) was an American educational reformer, abolitionist and Whig politician known for his commitment to promoting public education; he is thus also known as The Father of American Education. In 1848, after public service as Secretary of the Massachusetts State Board of Education, Mann was elected to the United States House of Representatives (1848–1853). From September 1852 to his death in 1859, he served as President of Antioch College.

Arguing that universal public education was the best way to provide a quality education for all of America's children, Mann won widespread approval from modernizers, especially in the Whig Party, for building public schools. Most U.S. states adopted a version of the system Mann established in Massachusetts, especially the program for normal schools to train professional teachers. Educational historians credit Horace Mann, along with Henry Barnard and Catharine Beecher, as one of the major advocates of the Common School Movement.

== Early years, family and education ==
The great-grandson of Samuel Man, Horace Mann was born in Franklin, Massachusetts.

Throughout his childhood, Mann experienced a variety of educational experiences from a vocational education working on the family farm to religious education. Mann came to see education as an essential component of a healthy childhood. From age ten to age twenty, he had no more than six weeks' schooling during any year, but he made use of the Franklin Public Library, the first public library in America. He enrolled at Brown University when he was twenty years old and graduated in three years as valedictorian (1819). The theme of his oration was "The Progressive Character of the Human Race." He learned Greek and Latin from Samuel Barrett, who later became a Unitarian minister.

== Early career ==
=== Legal career ===
Mann studied law for a short time in Wrentham, Massachusetts and was a tutor of Latin and Greek (1820–1822) and a librarian (1821–1823) at Brown. During 1822, he also studied at Litchfield Law School and, in 1823, was admitted to the bar in Dedham, Massachusetts.

Mann defended James Allen in reasonable doubt in the minds of the jury by pointing out that the victim had previously identified someone else as the man who robbed him. The strategy worked, and there was a hung jury.

=== Massachusetts legislature ===
Mann was elected to the Massachusetts legislature in 1827 and, in that role, was active in the interests of education, public charities, and laws for the suppression of alcoholic drinks and lotteries. He established an asylum in Worcester, and in 1833, was chairman of its board of trustees. Mann continued to be returned to the legislature as a representative from Dedham until his removal to Boston in 1833. While in the legislature, he was a member and part of the time chairman of the committee for the revision of the state statutes, and many salutary provisions were incorporated into the code at his suggestion. After their enactment, he was appointed one of the editors of the work and prepared its marginal notes and references to judicial decisions. He was elected to the Massachusetts State Senate from Boston in 1835 and was its president in 1836–1837. As a member of the Senate, he spent time as the majority leader and aimed his focus at infrastructure, funding the construction of railroads and canals.

== Personal life ==
In 1830, Mann married Charlotte Messer, the daughter of former Brown University president Asa Messer. She died two years later on August 1, 1832; he never fully recovered from the intense grief and shock that accompanied her death.

In 1843, he married Mary Tyler Peabody. Afterward, the couple accompanied Samuel Gridley Howe and Julia Ward Howe on a dual honeymoon to Europe. They subsequently purchased a home in West Newton, Massachusetts, at the corner of Chestnut and Highland Streets. Horace and Mary had three sons: Horace Mann Jr., George Combe Mann, and Benjamin Pickman Mann.

== Education reform ==
It was not until he was appointed Secretary in 1837 of the newly created Massachusetts Board of Education that he began the work which was to make him one of America's most influential educational reformers. Upon starting his duties, he withdrew from all other professional or business engagements as well as politics.

As Secretary of Education, Mann held teachers' conventions, delivered numerous lectures and addresses, carried on an extensive correspondence, and introduced numerous reforms. Mann persuaded his fellow modernizers, especially those in the Whig Party, to legislate tax-supported elementary public education in their states and to feminize the teaching force. To justify the new taxes, Mann assured businessmen that more education in the workforce made for a richer and more profitable economy.

Most northern states adopted one version or another of the system he established in Massachusetts, especially the program for "normal schools" to train professional teachers.

Mann traveled to every school in the state so he could physically examine each school's grounds. He planned and inaugurated the Massachusetts normal school system in Lexington (which shortly thereafter moved to Framingham), Barre (which shortly thereafter moved to Westfield) and Bridgewater, and began preparing a series of annual reports, which had a wide circulation and were considered as being "among the best expositions, if, indeed, they are not the very best ones, of the practical benefits of a common school education both to the individual and to the state". By his advocacy of the disuse of corporal punishment in school discipline, he was involved in a controversy with some of the Boston teachers that resulted in the adoption of his views.

In 1838, he founded and edited The Common School Journal.

In 1843, he went to Europe to visit schools, especially in Prussia, under the board's auspices but at his own expense. His seventh annual report, published after his return, embodied the results of his tour. Many editions of this report were printed in Massachusetts and other states, in some cases by private individuals and in others by legislatures; several editions were issued in England.

Mann hoped that by bringing all children of all classes together, they could have a common learning experience. This would also allow the less fortunate to advance on the social scale, and education would "equalize the conditions of men." Moreover, it was viewed also as a road to social advancement by the early labor movement and as a goal of having common schools. Mann also suggested that having schools would help those students who did not have appropriate discipline in the home. Building a person's character was as important as reading, writing, and arithmetic. Instilling values such as obedience to authority, promptness in attendance, and organizing the time according to bell ringing helped students prepare for future employment.

Mann faced some resistance from parents who did not want to give up moral education to teachers and bureaucrats. Despite being the pioneer who created the public school system Horace Mann home schooled his own children. The normal schools trained mostly women, giving them new career opportunities as teachers. Mann believed that women were better suited for teaching, regardless of their status as a mother, and partnered with Catharine Beecher to push for a feminization of the profession.

The practical result of Mann's work was meaningful reform in the approach used in the common school system of Massachusetts, which in turn influenced the direction of other states. In carrying out his work, Mann met with bitter opposition by some Boston schoolmasters who strongly disapproved of his innovative pedagogical ideas, and by various religious sectarians, who contended against the exclusion of all sectarian instruction from the schools.

=== Secular nature ===
As the Old Deluder Satan Act and other 17th-century Massachusetts School Laws attest, early education in Massachusetts had a clear religious intent. However, by the time of Mann's leadership in education, various developments (including a vibrant populist Protestant faith and increased religious diversity) fostered a secular school system with a religiously passive stance.

While Mann affirmed that "our Public Schools are not Theological Seminaries" and that they were "debarred by law from inculcating the peculiar and distinctive doctrines of any one religious denomination amongst us ... or all that is essential to religion or salvation," he assured those who objected to this secular nature that "our system earnestly inculcates all Christian morals; it founds its morals based on religion; it welcomes the religion of the Bible; and, in receiving the Bible, it allows it to do what it is allowed to do in no other system—to speak for itself. But here it stops, not because it claims to have compassed all truth, but because it disclaims to act as an umpire between hostile religious opinions."

Mann stated that this position resulted in a near-universal use of the Bible in the schools of Massachusetts and that this served as an argument against the assertion by some that Christianity was excluded from his schools, or that they were anti-Christian. A devotee of the pseudoscience of phrenology, Mann believed education could eliminate or reduce human failings and compensate for any biological flaws.

Mann also once stated that "it may not be easy theoretically, to draw the line between those views of religious truth and of Christian faith which is common to all, and may, therefore, with propriety be inculcated in schools, and those which, being peculiar to individual sects, are therefore by law excluded; still it is believed that no practical difficulty occurs in the conduct of our schools in this regard."

Rather than sanctioning a particular church as was often the norm in many states, the Legislature proscribed books "calculated to favor the tenets of any particular set of Christians."

=== Reading instruction ===
Like many nineteenth century reformers, Horace Mann believed that "children would find it far more interesting and pleasurable to memorize words and read short sentences and stories without having to bother to learn the names of the letters". According to Diane Ravitch, he condemned the alphabet method, claiming that it was "repulsive and soul-deadening to children". He described the letters of the alphabet as "skeleton-shaped, bloodless, ghostly apparitions". To him, teaching the alphabet was entirely illogical: "When we wish to give a child the idea of a new animal, we do not present successively the different parts of it,—an eye, an ear, the nose, the mouth, the body, or a leg: but we present a whole animal, as one object".

Mann believed that "children's earliest books should teach whole words, skipping the alphabet and the sounds of the letters", though he may have been confused between "the alphabet method of learning letters through words and a word method, now called the look-and-say method, or learning to read through saying the word as a whole".

Mann's endorsement of "word method" for reading instruction made a lasting impression on other reformers of the period, and "by 1890 the alphabet method had virtually died out". Francis Parker and John Dewey used the "word method" as one of the features of the "Progressive" system of education. As Nancy Millichap notes, "Despite the enthusiasm of educators for their new methods of teaching, the illiteracy rate remained high. Among American soldiers enlisted in World War I, 24.9 percent proved unable to read or write, and during World War II, approximately the same percentage of British servicemen [who were taught using the same method] were found to be similarly handicapped. In 1940, one-third of high school students were incapable of mastering reading and writing well enough to profit from textbook instruction, and one-half of the adult population in the United States was functionally illiterate".

The backlash against "word method" culminated in a 1955 book Why Johnny Can't Read by Rudolf Flesch, in which he condemned this method for "treating children as if they were dogs" and recommended returning to teaching phonics. Nevertheless, the "ill-informed, ineffective reading instruction" remains the norm in American colleges of education and, accordingly, in American elementary schools.

=== Admiration of the Prussian Model ===
Mann's efforts to update and strengthen Massachusetts's public education system began before he was appointed secretary of the Massachusetts Board of Education in 1837. He frequently communicated with fellow public education advocates and expressed an interest in learning how other governmental organizations approached educating their children. As part of his trip to Europe, Mann reported he visited:

England, Ireland, and Scotland; crossed the German Ocean to Hamburg; thence went to Magdeburg, Berlin, Potsdam, Halle, and Weissenfels, in the kingdom of Prussia; to Leipzig and Dresden, the two great cities in the kingdom of Saxony; thence to Erfurt, Weimar, Eisenach, on the great route from the middle of Germany to Frankfort on the Maine; thence to the Grand Duchy of Nassau, of Hesse Darmstadt, and of Baden; and, after visiting all the principal cities in the Rhenish Provinces of Prussia, passed through Holland and Belgium to Paris.

Mann explains the similarities and differences he saw in the various countries, and most notably, the lessons that American educators could learn from the various structures. Later in his report, he focuses on Prussia, given it had, in his words, "long enjoyed the most distinguished reputation for the excellence of its schools." The country's system would come to be known as the "Prussian model" and included tax-payer funded schools, professional teacher education, and a "common" experience across all schools. Although his report covered a number of topics, including the education of deaf and blind children and mental health institutions, he focused his arguments on convincing the legislatures of the importance of a common elementary education and the professionalization, including training, of teachers. The common-school movement quickly gained strength across the North. Connecticut adopted a similar system in 1849, and Massachusetts passed a compulsory attendance law in 1852. Mann's crusading style attracted wide middle-class support. Historian Ellwood P. Cubberley asserts:

No one did more than he to establish in the minds of the American people the conception that education should be universal, non-sectarian, free, and that its aims should be social efficiency, civic virtue, and character, rather than mere learning or the advancement of sectarian ends.

Arguing that universal public education was the best way to turn the nation's unruly children into disciplined, judicious republican citizens, Mann won widespread approval for building public schools from modernizers, especially among fellow Whigs. Most northeast states adopted one version or another of the system he established in Massachusetts, especially the program for "normal schools" to train professional teachers. Critics of the common school, and later public school movement sometimes use the a-historical phrase factory model school to describe the series of changes that happened to American schools over the 19th century.

== A Whig in Congress ==
In the spring of 1848, he was elected to the United States Congress as a Whig to fill the vacancy caused by the death of John Quincy Adams. His first speech in that role was in advocacy of its right and duty to exclude slavery from the territories, and in a letter, in December of that year, he said: "I think the country is to experience serious times. Interference with slavery will excite civil commotion in the South. But it is best to interfere. Now is the time to see whether the Union is a rope of sand or a band of steel." Again he said: "I really think if we insist upon passing the Wilmot proviso for the territories that the south—a part of them—will rebel; but I would pass it, rebellion or not. I consider no evil so great as the extension of slavery."

During the first session, he volunteered as counsel for Drayton and Sayres, who were indicted for stealing 76 slaves in the District of Columbia, and at the trial was engaged for 21 successive days in their defense. In 1850, he was engaged in a controversy with Daniel Webster concerning the extension of slavery and the Fugitive Slave Law, calling Webster's support for the Compromise of 1850 a "vile catastrophe", and comparing him to "Lucifer descending from Heaven". Mann was defeated by a single vote at the ensuing nominating convention by Webster's supporters; but, on appealing to the people as an independent anti-slavery candidate, he was re-elected, serving from April 1848 until March 1853.

== Abolitionism ==
Mann was a staunch opponent of slavery as a member of Congress; in a written address to an 1852 "Convention of the Colored Freemen of Ohio" he stated:

"[t]hat slavery is to continue always, it would be the grossest atheism to affirm. A belief in the existence of a just Governor of the Universe, includes a belief in the final and utter abolition of slavery."

In the same address, he opposed plans to forcibly deport freedmen from the United States to other nations:

"The idea of forcibly expelling the American born negro from the place of his birth and residence, and driving him out of the country against his will, is as abhorrent to my notions of justice and equality, as it can be to those of anyone. The next most cruel thing to kidnapping a race of men, forcing them from their home and dooming them to slavery in a foreign land, would be the seizure of the descendants of that race, and driving them from the new home they had acquired. So great a crime as this second expatriation would be, could hardly be conceived unless by a mind that had prepared itself for it by participating in the commission of the first."

Mann considered there to be three legitimate methods by which the Africans in captivity in the US could emancipate themselves, including, as a last resort, that

"such as our revolutionary fathers adopted against Great Britain [...] not only with the justification but with the approval of the civilized world. For this there are two conditions: a sufficient degree of oppression to authorize an appeal to force, and a chance, on the part of the oppressed, of bettering their condition. The measure of the first condition is already full - heaped up - running over. The second condition will be fulfilled, either when the slaves believe they can obtain their freedom by force, or when they are so elevated and enlarged in their moral conceptions as to appreciate that glorious supplication of Patrick Henry, 'Give me liberty or give me death!'"

Mann's preferred method for the self-emancipation of the slaves was that free blacks should voluntarily form all-black communities of their own - either in Jamaica or in another Caribbean nation - or perhaps in the American West - in which men like Frederick Douglass, Henry Bibb and Henry Box Brown "instead of making speeches might be making laws. Instead of commanding the types of a newspaper press [...] might be commanding armies and navies" and could more effectively organize the liberation of their enslaved brethren in the U.S. from these strongholds.

== Leadership of Antioch College and last years ==
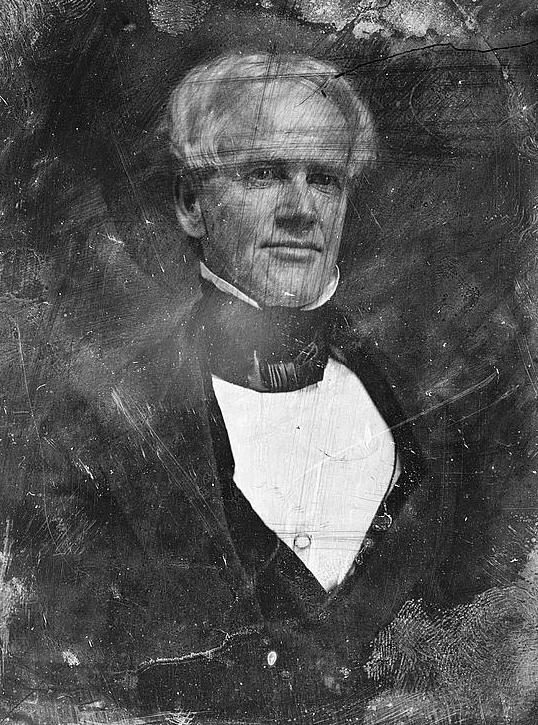
Original daguerreotype of Rep. Mann (Mass.) from Mathew Brady's studio, c. 1849

In September 1852, he was nominated for governor of Massachusetts by the Free Soil Party, and the same day was chosen president of the newly established Antioch College at Yellow Springs, Ohio. Failing in the election for governor, he accepted the presidency of the college, which he continued until his death. He taught economics, philosophy, and theology; he was popular with students and lay audiences across the Midwest who attended his lectures promoting public schools. Mann also employed the first female faculty member to be paid on an equal basis with her male colleagues, Rebecca Pennell, his niece. His commencement message to the class of 1859 was to "Be ashamed to die until you have won some victory for humanity".

Antioch College was founded by the Christian Connexion, which later withdrew its financial support, causing the college to struggle for many years with meager financial resources due to sectarian infighting. Mann himself was charged with nonadherence to sectarianism because, previously a Congregationalist by upbringing, he joined the Unitarian Church.

Mann was also drawn to Antioch because it was a coeducational institution, among the first in the country to teach men and women in the same classes. Mann and his wife had conflicts with female students, however, who came to Yellow Springs in search of greater equality. The young women chafed at restrictions on their behavior and wanted to meet with men in literary societies, which Mann and his wife opposed.

He collapsed shortly after the 1859 commencement and died that summer of typhoid fever. Antioch historian Robert Straker wrote that Mann had been "crucified by crusading sectarians." Ralph Waldo Emerson lamented "what seems the fatal waste of labor and life at Antioch." Mann's wife, who wrote in anguish that "the blood of martyrdom waters the spot," later disinterred his body from Yellow Springs. He is buried in the North Burial Ground in Providence, Rhode Island, next to his first wife.

== Legacy ==
Historians treat Mann as one of the most important leaders of education reform in the antebellum period.

=== Commemoration ===
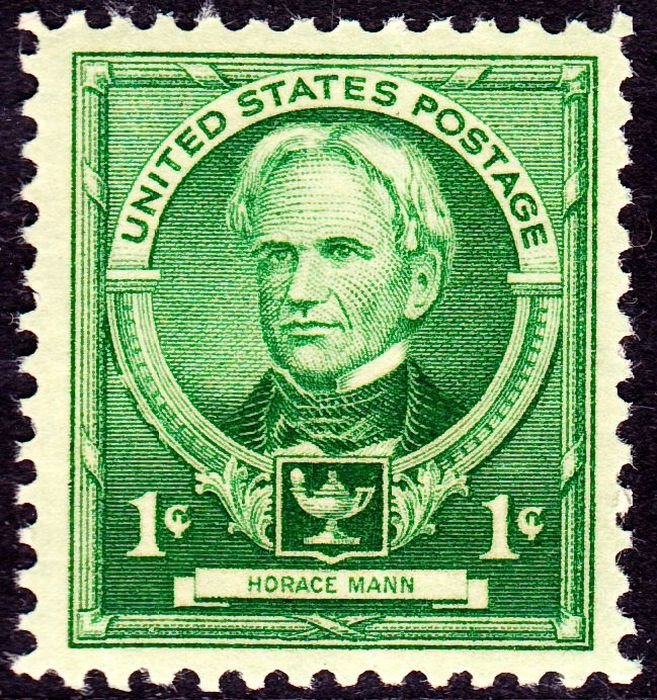
Mann on a 1940 stamp from the Famous Americans series

Many places around the world are named after Mann. Among them are more than 50 public schools in the United States.

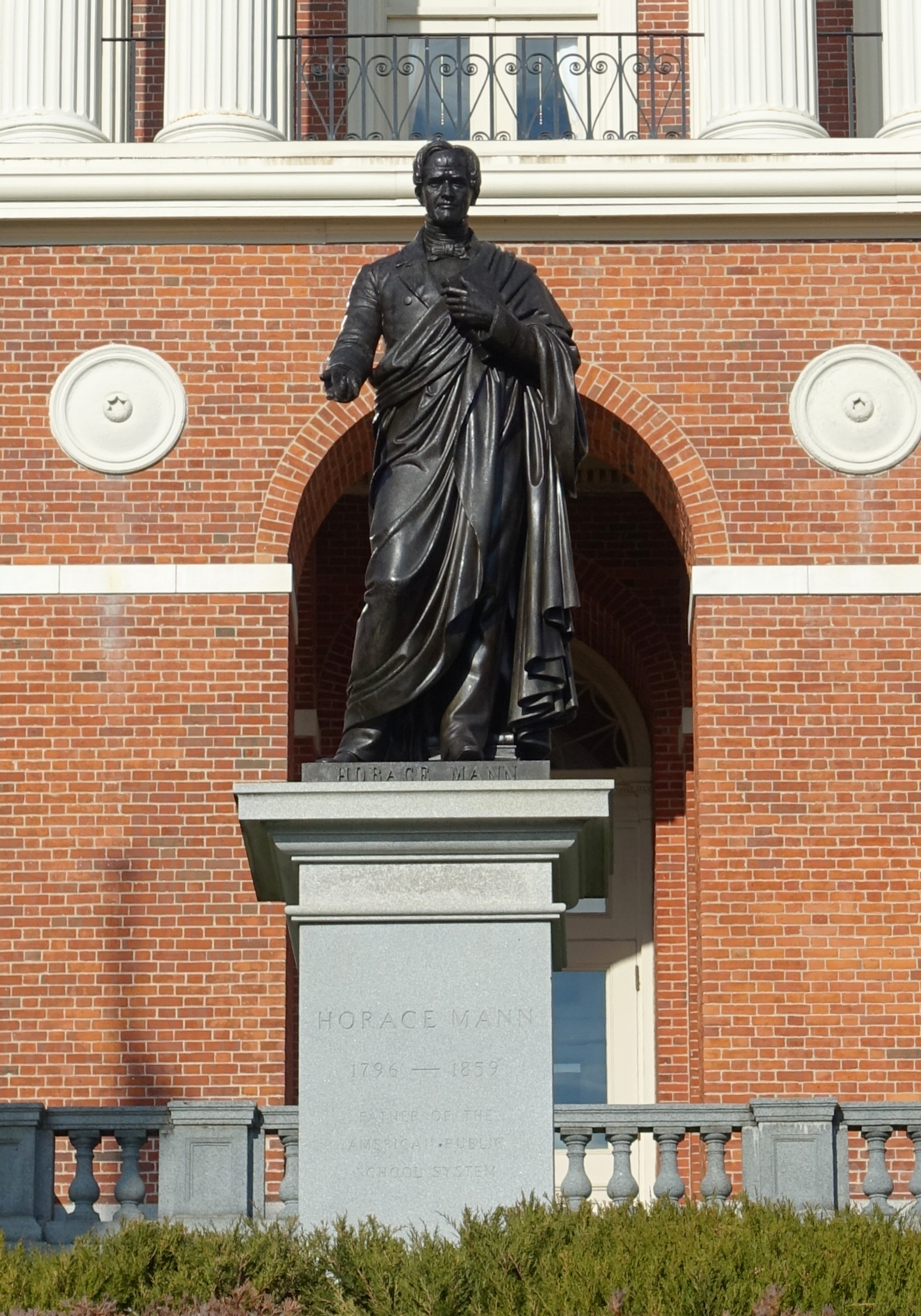
Statue of Horace Mann (1863) by Emma Stebbins

Horace Mann's statue stands in front of the Massachusetts State House along with that of Daniel Webster.

At Antioch College, a monument carries his quote, which has been recently adopted as the college motto: "Be Ashamed to Die Until You Have Won Some Victory for Humanity."

The University of Northern Colorado named the gates to their campus in his dedication, a gift of the Class of 1910.

The Springfield, Illinois- based Illinois Education Association Mutual Insurance Company was renamed in honor of Mann in 1950 as the Horace Mann Educators Corporation.

Pittsburg State University in Pittsburg, Kansas, has a building named Horace Mann School. It currently houses the Student Welcoming Center.

In Massachusetts, public charter schools that are authorized by local school districts are known as Horace Mann charters.

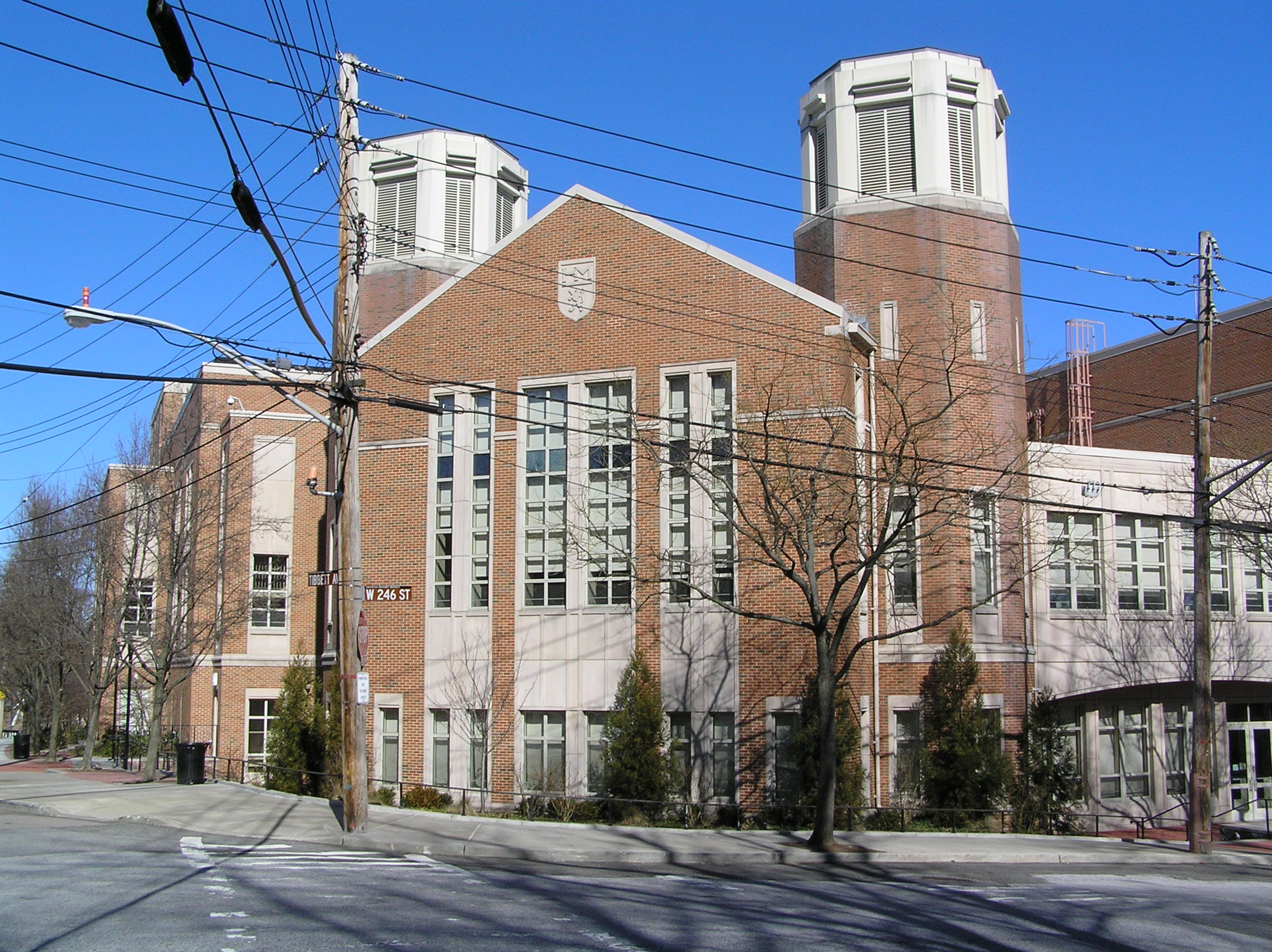
Horace Mann School, the Bronx, New York City

Brown University Graduate School awards an annual Horace Mann Medal to one of its alumni.

At Diamond Fork Middle School, a Horace Mann celebration was held on May 4, 2011, the same day he was born.

=== Schools ===
- Horace Mann Elementary School, (closed), (Kansas City, Kansas) "Horace Mann Elementary". Archived from the original on May 12, 2010.
- Horace Mann Elementary School, Detroit, Michigan
- Horace Mann Academy, Chicago, Illinois
- Horace Mann Elementary School, Anaheim, California
- Horace Mann Elementary School, Bakersfield, California
- Horace Mann Elementary School, Bayonne, New Jersey
- Horace Mann Elementary School, Beverly Hills, California
- Horace Mann Elementary School, Binghamton, New York
- Horace Mann Elementary School (closed), Canton, Ohio
- Horace Mann Elementary School, Cherry Hill, New Jersey
- Horace Mann Elementary School (closed), Clinton, Iowa
- Horace Mann Elementary School, Dayton, Ohio
- Horace Mann Elementary School, Duncan, Oklahoma
- Horace Mann Elementary School, Fargo, North Dakota
- Horace Mann Elementary School, Glendale, California
- Horace Mann Elementary School, Hominy, Oklahoma
- Horace Mann Elementary School, Huntington, Indiana
- Horace Mann Elementary School, Indiana, Pennsylvania
- Horace Mann Elementary School, Iowa City, Iowa
- Horace Mann Elementary School, Lakewood, Ohio
- Horace Mann Elementary School, Melrose, Massachusetts
- Horace Mann Elementary School, Newton, Massachusetts
- Horace Mann Elementary School, North Bergen, New Jersey
- Horace Mann Elementary School, Oakland, California
- Horace Mann Elementary School, Oak Park, Illinois
- Horace Mann Elementary School, Ogden, Utah
- Horace Mann Elementary School, Ottumwa, Iowa
- Horace Mann Elementary School (closed), Pittsburgh, Pennsylvania
- Horace Mann Elementary School, Rapid City, South Dakota
- Horace Mann Elementary School, Redmond, Washington
- Horace Mann Elementary (now Lincoln K-8) School, Rochester, Minnesota
- Horace Mann Elementary School, Saint Paul, Minnesota
- Horace Mann Elementary School, San Jose, California
- Horace Mann Elementary School, Sedalia, Missouri
- Horace Mann Elementary School, Sioux Falls, South Dakota
- Horace Mann Elementary School, Springfield, Ohio
- Horace Mann Elementary School, St Joseph, Missouri
- Horace Mann Elementary School, Washington, D.C.
- Horace Mann Elementary School, West Allis, Wisconsin
- Horace Mann K-8 Dual Language Magnet School, Wichita, Kansas
- Horace Mann Elementary School, Woodward, Oklahoma
- Horace Mann Lab School, Northwest Missouri State University, Maryville, Missouri
- Horace Mann Middle School, Abilene, Texas
- Horace Mann Middle School, Amarillo, Texas
- Horace Mann Junior School, Baytown, Texas
- Horace Mann Middle School, Brandon, Florida
- Horace Mann Middle School, Charleston, West Virginia
- Horace Mann Middle School, Colorado Springs, Colorado
- Horace Mann Middle School, El Portal, Florida
- Horace Mann Middle School, Franklin, Massachusetts
- Horace Mann Middle School, Neenah, Wisconsin
- Horace Mann Middle School, North Fond Du Lac, Wisconsin
- Horace Mann Junior High School (closed), Omaha, Nebraska
- Horace Mann Middle School, San Diego, California
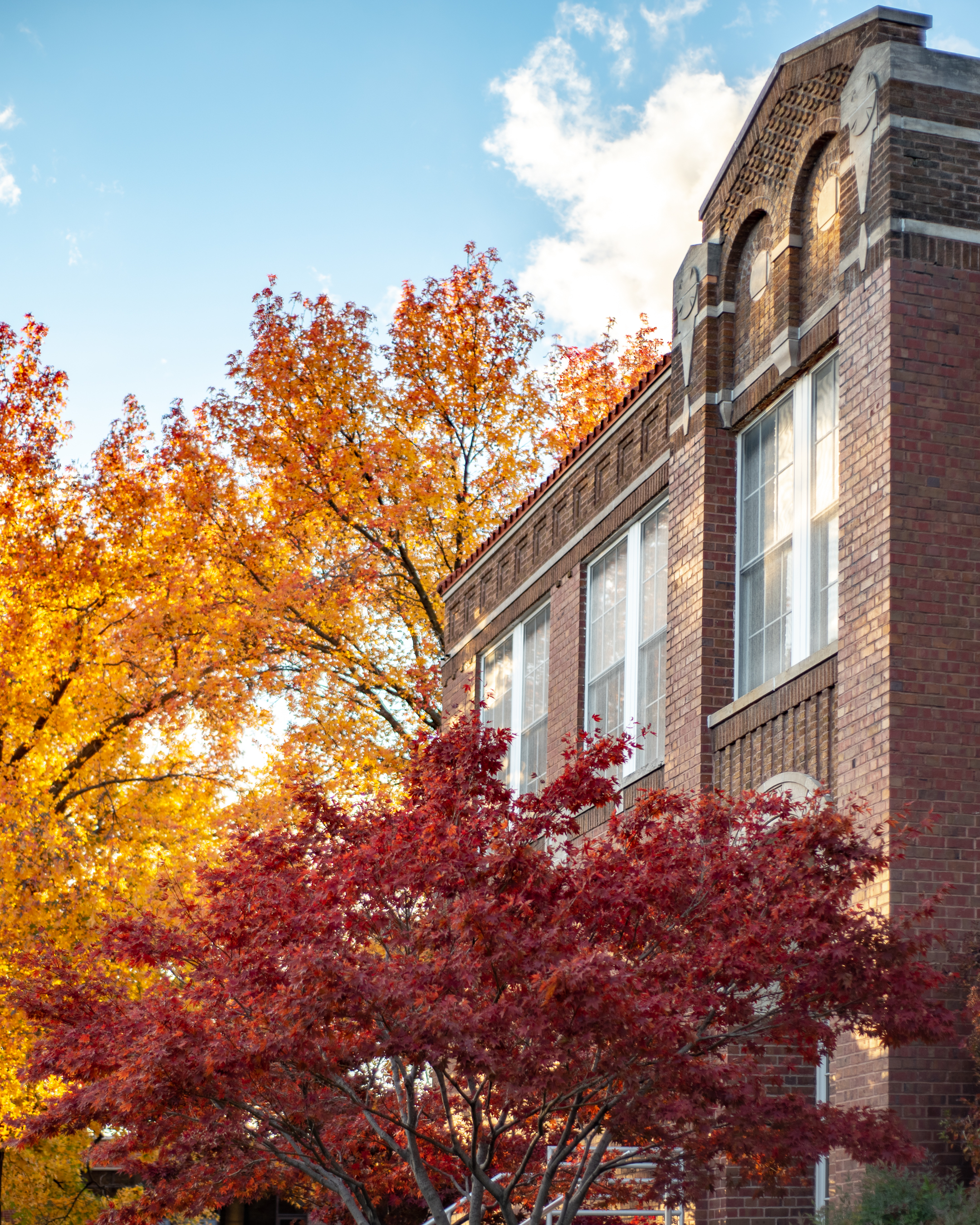
  Horace Mann Hall, Pittsburg State University, Pittsburg, Kansas
- Horace Mann Middle School, Sheboygan, Wisconsin
- Horace Mann Middle School, Wausau, Wisconsin
- Horace Mann High School, North Fond du Lac, Wisconsin
- Horace Mann School, Bronx, New York
- Horace Mann School, Amesbury, Massachusetts
- Horace Mann School, Seattle, Washington
- Horace Mann School, Salem, Massachusetts
- Horace Mann School for the Deaf and Hard of Hearing, Allston, Massachusetts
- Mann Arts and Science Magnet Middle School, Little Rock, Arkansas
- Mann Elementary School, Long Beach, California
- Mann Elementary School, St. Louis, Missouri
- Mann Elementary School, Tacoma, Washington
- P.S. 90 - Horace Mann, Queens, New York
- Trevista at Horace Mann Elementary School, Denver, CO
- Buena Vista Horace Mann K-8, San Francisco, California

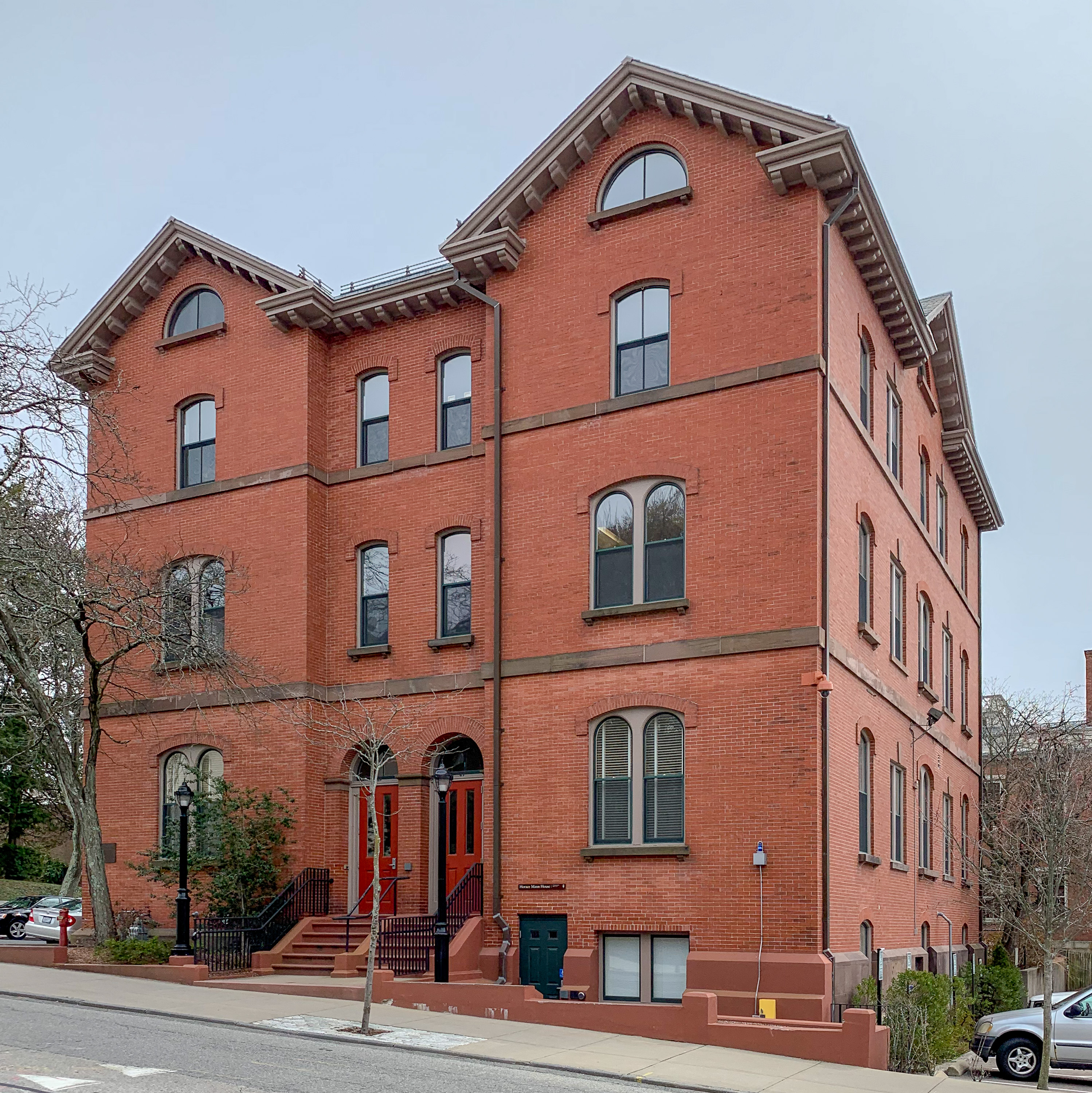
Horace Mann House at Brown University, Mann's alma mater

=== College and university buildings ===
- Horace Mann Auditorium, Bridgewater State University, Bridgewater, Massachusetts
- Horace Mann Building, East Central University in Ada, Oklahoma
- Horace Mann Building, Pittsburg State University, Pittsburg, Kansas
- Horace Mann Center, Westfield State University in Westfield, Massachusetts
- Horace Mann Hall, Teachers College, Columbia University, New York City
- Horace Mann Hall, Framingham State University, Framingham, Massachusetts
- Horace Mann Hall, Rhode Island College, Providence, Rhode Island
- Horace Mann House, Brown University, Providence, Rhode Island

== Works ==
- A Few Thoughts for a Young Man (Boston, 1850)
- Slavery: Letters and Speeches (1851)
- Powers and Duties of Woman (1853)
- Sermons (1861)
- Life and Complete Works of Horace Mann (2 vols., Cambridge, 1869)
- Thoughts Selected from the Writings of Horace Mann (1869)
- The Case for Public Schools
- Mann, Horace. The Life and Works of Horace Mann, with an introduction by his second wife, Mary Peabody Mann.

== See also ==
- History of education in Massachusetts

== Works cited ==
- Hanson, Robert Brand (1976). Dedham, Massachusetts, 1635-1890. Dedham Historical Society.
- Parr, James L. (2009). Dedham: Historic and Heroic Tales From Shiretown. The History Press. ISBN 978-1-59629-750-0.

Party political offices
Preceded by John G. Palfrey	Free Soil nominee for Governor of Massachusetts; 1852	Succeeded by Henry Wilson
U.S. House of Representatives
Preceded by John Quincy Adams	Member of the U.S. House of Representatives from Massachusetts's 8th congressional district April 3, 1848 – March 3, 1853	Succeeded by Tappan Wentworth
