= National Register of Historic Places listings in Fountain County, Indiana =

Location of Fountain County in Indiana

This is a list of the National Register of Historic Places listings in Fountain County, Indiana.

This is intended to be a complete list of the properties and districts on the National Register of Historic Places in Fountain County, Indiana, United States. Latitude and longitude coordinates are provided for many National Register properties and districts; these locations may be seen together in a map.

There are 19 properties and districts listed on the National Register in the county.

Properties and districts located in incorporated areas display the name of the municipality, while properties and districts in unincorporated areas display the name of their civil township. Properties and districts split between multiple jurisdictions display the names of all jurisdictions.

This National Park Service list is complete through NPS recent listings posted August 29, 2025.

== Current listings ==
	Name on the Register	Image	Date listed	Location	City or town	Description
1	Attica Downtown Historic District	Attica Downtown Historic District	September 16, 1993 (#93000951)	Roughly Perry St. between Jackson and Ferry Sts. and Main and Mill Sts. between 3rd and Brady Sts. 40°17′39″N 87°14′59″W	Attica	
2	Attica Main Street Historic District	Attica Main Street Historic District	June 10, 1994 (#94000581)	Roughly bounded by Jackson, Brady, Short, and Canada Sts. 40°17′33″N 87°14′47″W	Attica	
3	Bethel Church and Graveyard	Bethel Church and Graveyard	March 3, 1995 (#95000203)	Bethel Rd., 0.5 miles west of its junction with Riverside Rd. and east of Attica; 40°17′47″N 87°10′39″W	Logan Township	
4	Brady Street Historic District	Brady Street Historic District	December 7, 1990 (#90001785)	Roughly bounded by S. Perry, E. Jackson, S. Council, and E. Pike Sts. 40°17′26″N 87°14′56″W	Attica	
5	Cades Mill Covered Bridge	Cades Mill Covered Bridge	May 24, 2021 (#100006570)	Cades Hollow Rd. over Coal Cr. 40°03′50″N 87°18′44″W	Veedersburg vicinity	
6	Carnegie Library of Covington	Carnegie Library of Covington	April 3, 1989 (#89000239)	622 S. 5th St. 40°08′26″N 87°23′40″W	Covington	
7	Covington Courthouse Square Historic District	Covington Courthouse Square Historic District	September 14, 2015 (#15000593)	Roughly bounded by 3rd St. and alleys north of Washington, east of 4th, and south of Liberty Sts. 40°08′13″N 87°23′50″W	Covington	
8	Covington Residential Historic District	Covington Residential Historic District	September 14, 2015 (#15000594)	Roughly bounded by Pearl, Liberty, 4th, and 7th Sts. 40°08′22″N 87°23′44″W	Covington	
9	Fountain County Clerk's Building	Fountain County Clerk's Building	June 27, 2002 (#02000692)	516 4th St. 40°08′20″N 87°23′49″W	Covington	
10	Fountain County Courthouse	Fountain County Courthouse	March 19, 2008 (#08000191)	301 4th St. 40°08′12″N 87°23′50″W	Covington	
11	Clinton F. Hesler Farm	Clinton F. Hesler Farm	July 13, 1989 (#89000770)	County Road 450S between 200E and 300E, southeast of Veedersburg; 40°03′39″N 87°12′56″W	Millcreek Township	
12	James and Lucinda McDonald House	James and Lucinda McDonald House	September 12, 2016 (#16000611)	500 E. Jackson St. 40°17′28″N 87°14′32″W	Attica	
13	Marshall M. Milford House	Marshall M. Milford House	January 26, 1989 (#88003037)	414 E. Main St. 40°17′33″N 87°14′41″W	Attica	
14	Old East Historic District	Old East Historic District	November 28, 1990 (#90001784)	400 block of E. Washington St. and the 400 and 500 blocks of E. Monroe St. 40°17′21″N 87°14′41″W	Attica	
15	Rob Roy Covered Bridge	Rob Roy Covered Bridge	May 25, 2021 (#100006571)	Covered Bridge Rd. over Big Shawnee Cr. 40°14′37″N 87°14′46″W	Rob Roy vicinity	
16	William C.B. Sewell House	William C.B. Sewell House	October 11, 1984 (#84000027)	602 E. Washington St. 40°08′16″N 87°23′39″W	Covington	
17	Veedersburg Clover Leaf Route Depot		August 21, 2020 (#100005516)	295 East 2nd St. 40°06′47″N 87°15′35″W	Veedersburg	
18	Veedersburg First Christian Church		September 2, 2025 (#100012173)	301 North Mill Street; 40°06′51″N 87°15′48″W	Veedersburg	
19	Wallace Covered Bridge	Wallace Covered Bridge	May 24, 2021 (#100006568)	Off Lutheran Church Rd. over Sugar Mill Cr. 39°59′06″N 87°08′40″W	Wallace	

== See also ==
- List of National Historic Landmarks in Indiana
- National Register of Historic Places listings in Indiana
- Listings in neighboring counties: Montgomery, Parke, Tippecanoe, Vermillion, Warren
- List of Indiana state historical markers in Fountain County
