= Covington Residential Historic District =

Historic district in Indiana, United States

- U.S. National Register of Historic Places
- U.S. Historic district
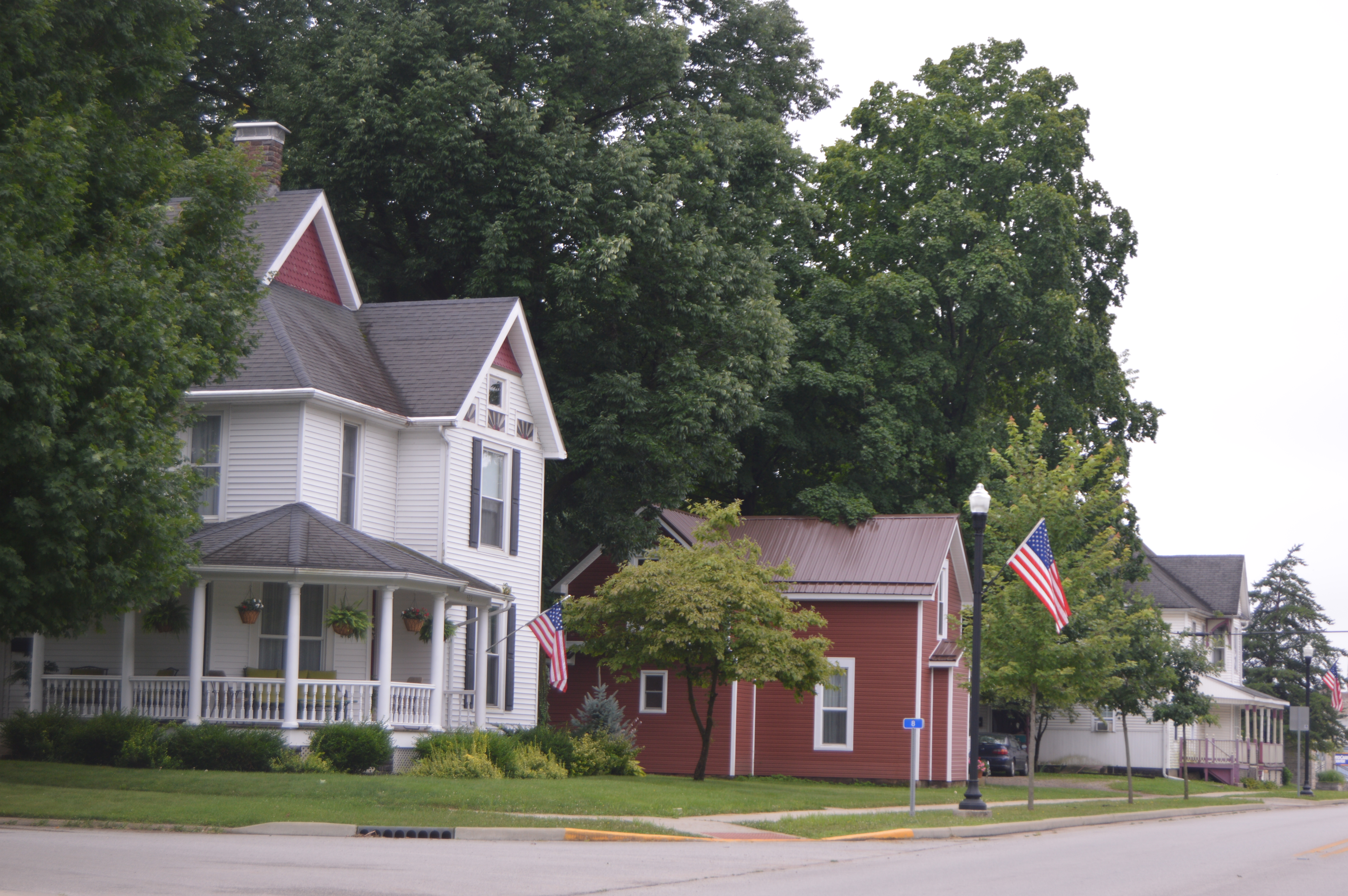
- Houses on Liberty Street

- Location within Fountain County, Indiana Location within Indiana Location within the United States
- Location: Roughly bounded by Pearl, Liberty, 4th & 7th Sts., Covington, Indiana
- Coordinates: 40°08′22″N 87°23′44″W
- Area: 30 acres (12 ha)
- Architect: Liese and Ludwig; Brown, Charles
- Architectural style: Federal, Italianate, Gothic Revival, Greek Revival, Queen Anne, Colonial Revival
- NRHP reference No.: 15000594
- Added to NRHP: September 14, 2015

Covington Residential Historic District is a national historic district located at Covington, Indiana. The district encompasses 109 contributing buildings in a predominantly residential section of Covington. It developed between about 1830 and 1958, and includes notable examples of Gothic Revival, Federal, Greek Revival, Italianate, Queen Anne, and Colonial Revival style architecture. Located in the district are the separately listed Carnegie Library of Covington, Fountain County Clerk's Building, and William C.B. Sewell House. Other notable contributing buildings include the Senator Daniel W. Voorhees House (c. 1880), Ward House (c. 1890), Kid & Mary DeHaven House (1880), Bisland House (1910), Spinning House (c. 1898), Mayer House (1907), Johnson House (c. 1915), Ristine-Savage House (1852), J. D. Fine Boggs House (1923–1924), Livengood House (c. 1930), Enos H. Nebeker House (1894), Hamilton-Reed House (c. 1835, 1886), Covington Methodist Church (1889), Clark House (c. 1865), and Allen-Cates House (c. 1870).

It was listed on the National Register of Historic Places in 2015.
