= List of Indiana state historical markers in Fountain County =

Location of Fountain County in Indiana

This is a list of the Indiana state historical markers in Fountain County.

This is intended to be a complete list of the official state historical markers placed in Fountain County, Indiana, United States by the Indiana Historical Bureau. The locations of the historical markers and their latitude and longitude coordinates are included below when available, along with their names, years of placement, and topics as recorded by the Historical Bureau. There are 5 historical markers located in Fountain County.

== Historical markers ==
Marker title	Image	Year placed	Location	Topics
Boyhood Home of Daniel W. Voorhees		1970	Junction of U.S. Route 41 and County Road 100N, about 0.25 miles north of Exit 15 on Interstate 74, 2 miles north of Veedersburg; 40°8′34″N 87°14′35″W	Arts and Culture, Politics
Esther Test Wallace 1807-1834		1970	Liberty Street (U.S. Route 136) between 8th and 9th Streets at Oak Grove Cemetery in Covington; 40°8′15″N 87°23′25″W	Women, Arts and Culture, Politics
Attica & Covington Canal Skirmish		1997	200 W. Washington Street at the entrance to Potawatomi Park in Attica; 40°17′32″N 87°15′6″W	Transportation, Nature and Natural Disasters, Business, Industry, and Labor
Ravine Park		2003	Ravine Park Boulevard at the E. Jackson Street entrance to Ravine Park in Attica; 40°17′24″N 87°14′18″W	American Indian/Native American, Nature and Natural Disasters
Attica's Carnegie Library		2005	305 S. Perry Street in Attica; 40°17′30.7″N 87°14′58″W	Carnegie Library, Buildings and Architecture, Education
1846 Canal Skirmish (Replaced Attica & Covington Canal Skirmish marker)		2023	Northeast intersection of W. Washington St. and S. Market St., Attica	Transportation, Nature and Natural Disasters, Business, Industry, and Labor

== See also ==
- List of Indiana state historical markers
- National Register of Historic Places listings in Fountain County, Indiana
