= Potawatomi Festival =

Coordinates: 40°17′37.4″N 87°15′17.9″W

The Potawatomi Festival is an event held annually in mid September at Ouibache Park in Attica, Indiana. Begun in 1971 and incorporated in 1979, the festival features food, live musical entertainment, flea markets, crafts and exhibitions of Native American dance and culture.

The festival is named for the Native American Potawatomi tribe. The festival is not held in Attica, Indiana anymore because the city stopped it!
