= John L. Griffiths =

American lawyer and diplomat (1855–1914)

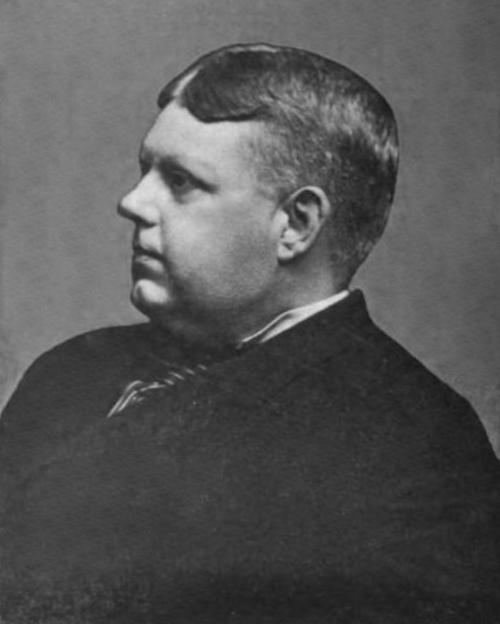
- Born: October 7, 1855; New York, New York, US
- Died: May 17, 1914 (aged 58); London, UK
- Burial place: Green-Wood Cemetery
- Education: Iowa State University
- Occupations: Lawyer, politician, diplomat
- Spouse: Caroline Henderson (m. 1889)

John Lewis Griffiths (October 7, 1855 – May 17, 1914), was an American lawyer and diplomat. He served in the Indiana state legislature, was active in Republican politics, and was Consul General of the United States to Britain, from 1905 until his death in 1914.

== Early life ==
John Lewis Griffiths was born in New York City, the son of Welsh immigrants David G. Griffiths and Elizabeth Griffiths. He moved with his parents to Iowa after the American Civil War, and completed his undergraduate and legal education at Iowa State University, earning a law degree in 1875.

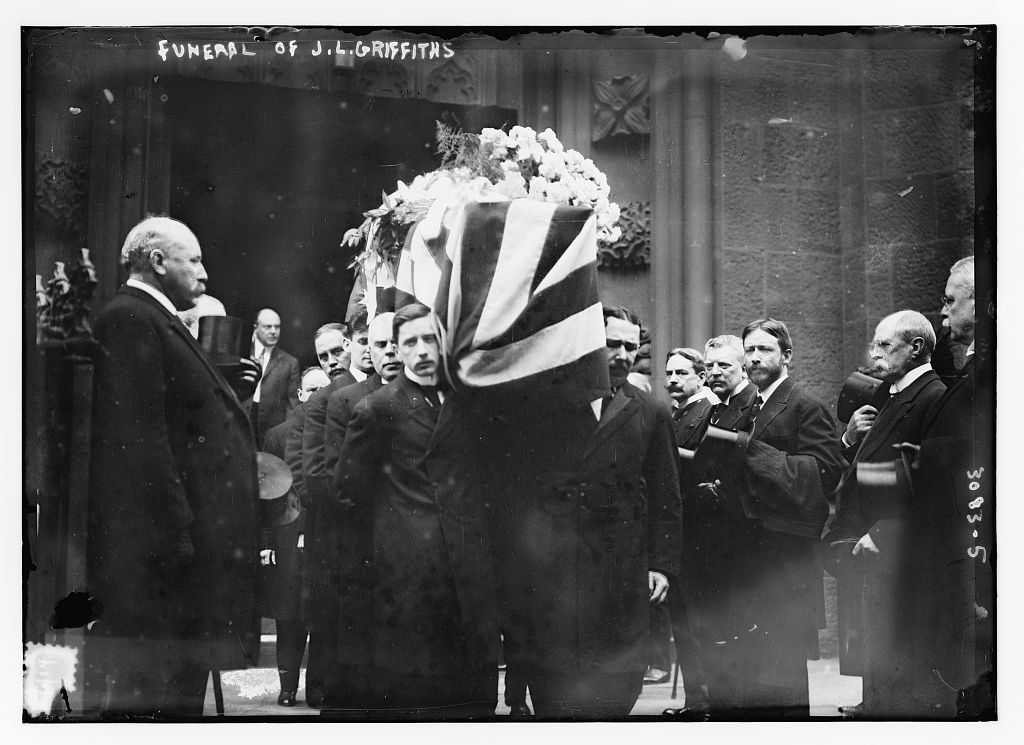
Funeral for Griffiths, May 1914

== Career ==
Griffiths practiced as a lawyer in Indianapolis. He served in the Indiana legislature in 1886 and 1887, and twice ran unsuccessfully for governor. He was active in Republican politics and a popular orator. In 1905, he was appointed as the United States consul in Liverpool. In 1909, he became the American consul-general in London. He was writing a biography of William Henry Harrison at the time of his death in 1914.

== Personal life ==
Griffiths married Caroline Henderson in 1889. He died suddenly, from an apparent heart attack, in London in 1914, aged 58 years. His funeral was held in New York City, and his grave is in Brooklyn's Green-Wood Cemetery. His widow edited a collection of his speeches, The Greater Patriotism, published in 1918. His home in Indianapolis is now known as the Kemper House, and houses the Historic Landmarks Foundation of Indiana.
