= Wilber Moore Stilwell =

American depression era artist

Wilber Moore Stilwell (1908–1974) was an American depression era artist, White House/National Gallery of Art/American Artists Professional League honoree, inventor, patent holder, author, and Chair of Art, University of South Dakota.

== Personal ==
Artist Wilber Moore Stilwell was born February 2, 1908 and in 1909 moved with his family from Covington, Indiana to Emporia, Kansas where he was raised. (#35) In 1933 he married Gladys Louise Ferree of Emporia, Kansas. He retired from USD in 1973. He died in 1974.

== Career ==
He attended the Kansas City Art Institute from 1929 to 1933. (#7). R.A. Holland, the director of the KCAI at that time, wrote, "Mr. Stilwell is not only one of our most talented students but a young man of fine character and industrious." From 1930 to 1933, Stilwell taught junior drawing at the Kansas City Art Institute (#7).

In 1930, Stilwell was selected to paint a mural for the Lindberg Theatre and won a cash award and the Harold B. Franklin Trophy. In 1932 he won second prize in oil portraiture and first prize in wrought iron design at the Missouri State Fair. In the 1933 Midwest Artists Exhibition Stilwell won the bronze medal for his charcoal, "Tiger Eating," chosen from the best works from 5 states.

In 1934 his "Santa Fe Roundhouse" pastel won third place in the Midwestern Artists Exhibition which included nationally known regionalist artists Grant Wood (#9), John Steuart Curry ( #10), and Thomas Hart Benton, and resulted in Stilwell's first of many listings in Who's Who in American Art. (#33).

In 1934, Stilwell exhibited a watercolor painting at the Pennsylvania Academy of the Fine Arts and worked for 10 months on 25 murals at the Dyche Natural History Museum at the University of Kansas as part of a Civil Works Project.(#22,#23). At least one of his oil paintings was commissioned as a WPA project.(#24)

From 1933 to 1935, with W. George Nightengale, a former student, Stilwell established the Emporia School of Art and taught fine and commercial arts.

From 1935 to 1939 Stilwell was the registrar at the Kansas City Art Institute where he worked with Thomas Hart Benton, who was also on faculty at that time. ( #7).

In 1936 he again won third prize in the Midwestern Artists Exhibition. From 1938 to 1940 he was awarded over 50 premiums, first, second, and third place prizes in Fine and Commercial Arts in professional exhibitions in the USA.

In 1939, Stilwell's watercolor, "May, Kansas", was chosen for the Midwestern Artists Exhibition and for the Preview of the New York World's Fair.(#34).

In 1940, Stilwell earned his Bachelor of Science Degree in Education from the Kansas State Teachers College, Emporia, Kansas. In 1941 he won a graduate full-tuition fellowship to the University of Iowa, Iowa City, where he earned his master's degree in art (#11). Members of Stilwell's graduate committee included Emil Ganso, chair, (#12) and Fletcher Martin (#13).

In 1941, Stilwell became Chair of the Art Department at the University of South Dakota, Vermillion. (#27,#31). In 1942, he won the Sweepstake Award in prints and first place in color lithography at the Kansas Art Exhibition, Topeka.

As Chair of the Art Department at USD, Stilwell established the USD Summer High School Art Camp, as well as serving many times as judge for art competitions at the Missouri State Fair and the South Dakota State Fair.

Stilwell and his wife Gladys published multiple articles in the School Arts Magazine, the SDEA Journal, and were also featured in the Minneapolis Tribune. Their interests and creativity extended beyond fine arts and resulted in many innovations and the award of a patent which was featured in "Popular Science Magazine" (October 1953).

During his tenure at USD Stilwell served as South Dakota Director of American Art Week and won numerous awards in national competition for reports and books designed, authored, and edited about American Art Week in South Dakota. Stilwell also served as judge for many professional and amateur art competitions in South Dakota and other midwestern states.

Stilwell's teaching helped his students achieve success, for example Dale Hale and Judeen Kozak Petersen.

On March 17, 1966, at the White House, First Lady Lady Bird Johnson (# 41) awarded Stilwell the National Gallery of Art Medal for his Distinguished Service to Education. This medal was created by Leonard Baskin (#42) and John Everett Benson, which was given to celebrate the National Gallery of Art's twenty-fifth anniversary and was reported by National Geographic. Lady Bird Johnson later wrote in her published diary about meeting Wilber Stilwell. (#14).

In 1966 in New York City, Wheeler Williams and the American Artists Professional League awarded Stilwell the rarely bestowed gold medal for Distinguished Service to American Art. (#29,#30, #32).

== Recognition ==
In 1984, in Stilwell's honor, John A. Day of the University of South Dakota and Gladys Ferree Stilwell initiated "The Stilwell Annual Awards Exhibition" which still continues at USD in Vermillion, South Dakota.

In 2003 the University of South Dakota launched the "Wilber Stilwell Retrospective Exhibition" displaying 26 out of hundreds of Stilwell's original works.

In March 2009 the University of South Dakota presented "Rediscovered Talent: Retrospective Exhibition of Wilber Stilwell" highlighting 50 of his works including oils, watercolors, charcoals, stone lithographs, cartoons, pencils, pen and ink, colored pencils, and pastels. "Eddie Welch, director of the University Art Galleries, said the Stilwell Retrospective Exhibition was organized to emphasize Stilwell's talent as an artist and to celebrate the 75th anniversary of the beginning of the art programs of the New Deal—a 10-year period when American art became the art of the people."
