= Bethel Church and Graveyard =

Historic church and cemetery in Indiana, United States

- U.S. National Register of Historic Places
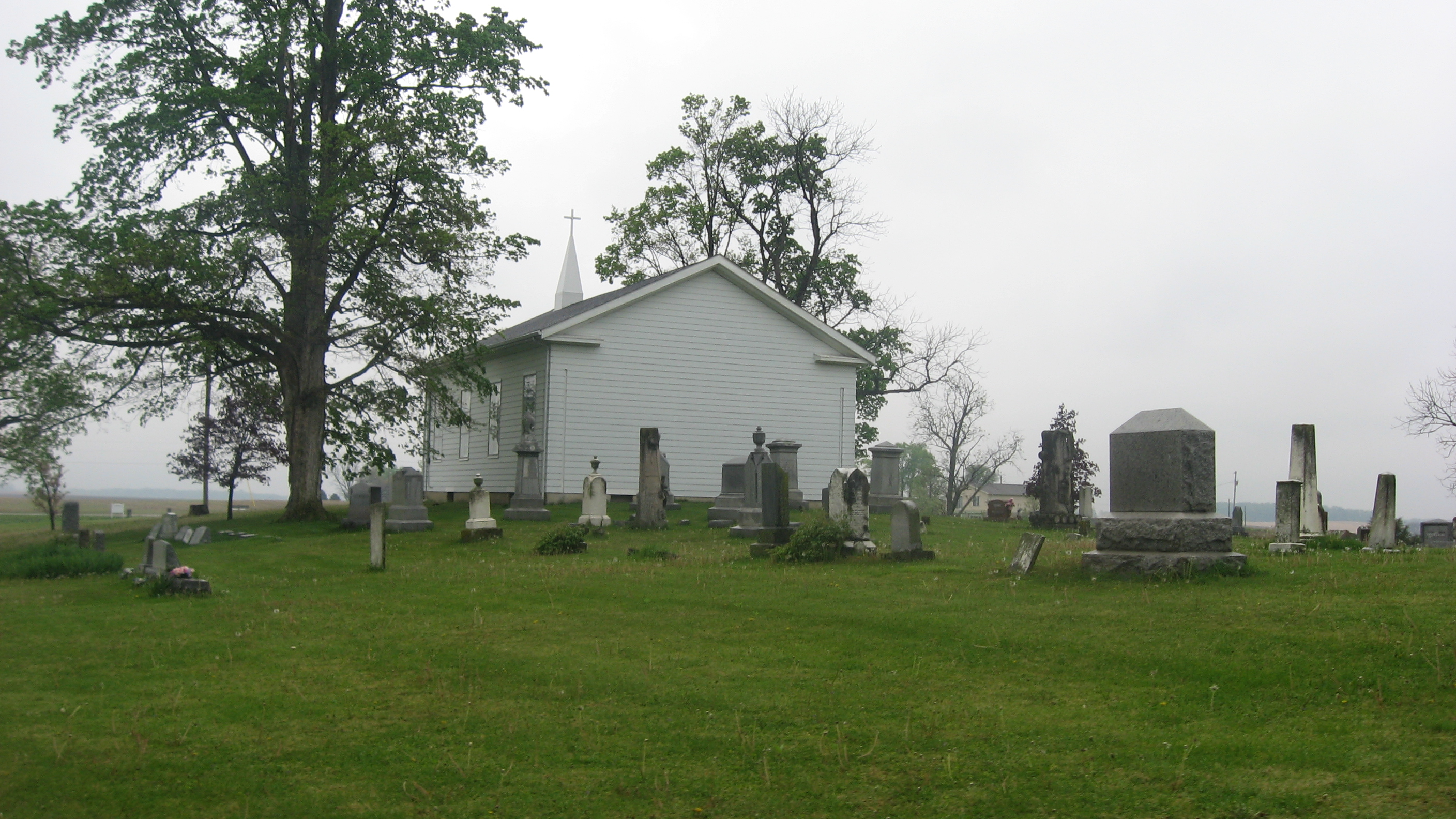
- Bethel Church and Graveyard, April 2012

- Location within Fountain County, Indiana Location within Indiana Location within the United States
- Location: Bethel Rd., 0.5 miles west of its junction with Riverside Rd. and east of Attica, Logan Township, Fountain County, Indiana
- Coordinates: 40°17′47″N 87°10′39″W
- Area: 7.3 acres (3.0 ha)
- Built: 1825, 1850
- Architectural style: Greek Revival
- NRHP reference No.: 95000203
- Added to NRHP: March 3, 1995

Bethel Church and Graveyard, also known as Bethel Community Church, is a historic church and cemetery in Logan Township, Fountain County, Indiana. The church was built in 1850 and is a one-story, simple Greek Revival-style timber-frame building. It measures 36 by 50 feet (11 by 15 m). It has a medium-pitched gable roof and sits on a sandstone block foundation coated in stucco. The congregation has been meeting on this site since 1825. The first marked burial in the adjacent cemetery dates to 1825.

It was listed on the National Register of Historic Places in 1995.
