= Caroline Henderson Griffiths =

American philanthropist

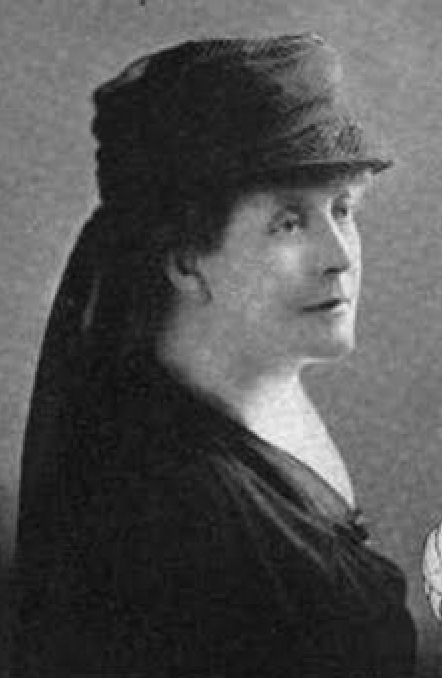
- Caroline Henderson Griffiths, from a 1921 publication
- Born: Carrie Henderson; November 26, 1861; Covington, Indiana, US
- Died: August 13, 1937 (aged 75); New York, New York, US
- Occupation: Philanthropist
- Spouse: John L. Griffiths

Caroline Henderson Griffiths (November 26, 1861 – August 13, 1937) was an American diplomat's wife and philanthropist. After World War I, she organized book and equipment donations for children's libraries in Belgium and France.

== Early life ==
Caroline Henderson was born in Covington, Indiana, and raised in Lafayette, the daughter of Albert Henderson and Lorana Richmond Henderson. She earned a bachelor's degree in 1880, as one of the first women to graduate from Purdue University. Her older brother Charles Richmond Henderson was a sociology professor at the University of Chicago; her older sister Julia Henderson Levering wrote a book on Indiana history.

== Career ==
Henderson wrote a handbook on wood carving, published in 1887. Griffiths was an officer of the Indiana Soldiers' Aid Society in 1898. In Indianapolis, she supported the Flower Mission Home for Incurables, a hospital she helped establish in 1903. In 1918 she edited The Greater Patriotism, a collection of her late husband's speeches.

After World War I, Griffiths headed the American Book Committee on Children's Libraries, organized to deliver children's books and library furniture to Belgian and French communities recovering from the war. Griffiths is credited with bringing the first children's libraries and reading rooms in Paris and Brussels. The L'Heure Joyeuse programs also provided training for children's librarians; the Paris site counted writer Claire Huchet Bishop among its first librarians. "In establishing children's libraries and reading rooms in Belgium and France," she explained, "we are only paying a little on a very large debt which America owes to Europe for the delightful hours the children in every generation have received from the great storytellers in Europe."

== Personal life ==
Henderson married lawyer and diplomat John Lewis Griffiths in 1889. She was widowed when Griffiths died in London in 1914. Their home in Indianapolis is now known as the Kemper House, and houses the Historic Landmarks Foundation of Indiana. She died in New York in 1937, aged 75 years. Her grave is in Green-Wood Cemetery in Brooklyn.
