= Charles Stewart Voorhees =

American attorney and politician from Washington (state)

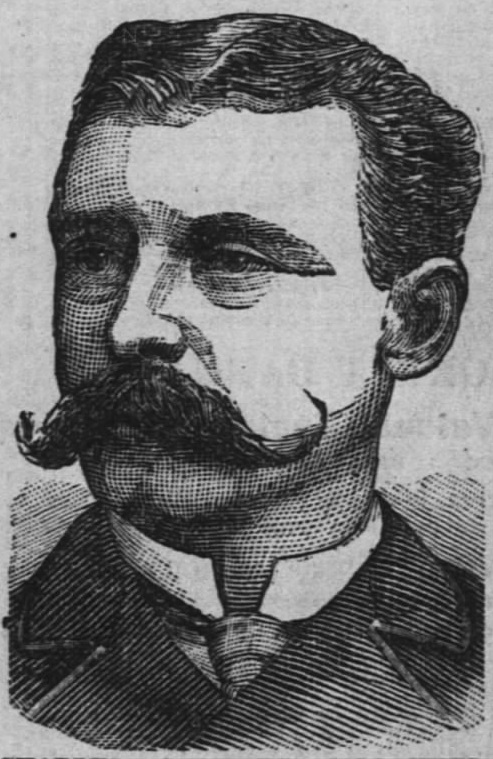
- image from The Times-Picayune (New Orleans, Louisiana), March 25, 1888

Delegate to the United States House of Representatives from Washington Territory
- In office March 4, 1885 – March 3, 1889
- Preceded by: Thomas H. Brents
- Succeeded by: John B. Allen

Prosecuting Attorney of Whitman County, Washington
- In office 1882–1886
- Preceded by: None (position created)
- Succeeded by: James V. O'Dell

Personal details
- Born: June 4, 1853 Covington, Indiana, U.S.
- Died: December 26, 1909 (aged 56) Spokane, Washington, U.S.
- Resting place: Greenwood Cemetery, Spokane, Washington
- Party: Democratic
- Spouse: Frances "Fanny" Belle Vajen (m. 1888-1909, his death)
- Children: 1
- Parent(s): Daniel Wolsey Voorhees; Anna Hardesty Voorhees
- Education: Wabash College; Georgetown College
- Profession: Attorney

Charles Stewart Voorhees (June 4, 1853 – December 26, 1909) was an American lawyer and a two-term delegate to the U.S. Congress from the Territory of Washington.

== Biography ==
Voorhees was born in Covington, Indiana on June 4, 1853, a son of Anna Hardesty Voorhees and Daniel Wolsey Voorhees, who served in the U.S. House and U.S. Senate from Indiana. He attended Wabash College in Crawfordsville, Indiana, and in 1873 he graduated from Georgetown College in Washington, D.C., June 26, 1873.

After graduating from college, Voorhees studied law. He attained admission to the bar in 1875 and commenced practice in Terre Haute, Indiana. In 1882, Voorhees moved to Washington Territory with his friend John L. Wilson, and settled in Colfax to establish a law practice. From 1882 to 1886 he served as prosecuting attorney of Whitman County.

A Democrat, in 1884 Voorhees was elected as Washington's territorial delegate. He was reelected in 1886 and served in the 49th and 50th Congresses (March 4, 1885 – March 3, 1889). During the 50th Congress, the U.S. House and Senate passed the Enabling Act of 1889, which provided the process for Washington Territory to achieve statehood.

In 1888, Voorhees lost reelection to Republican John B. Allen, who served as delegate until Washington joined the Union as a state in November 1889. After leaving Congress, Voorhees resumed the practice of law in Colfax. He later moved to Spokane, where he continued the practice law. He died in Spokane on December 26, 1909. Voorhees was buried at Greenwood Cemetery in Spokane.

== Family ==
In 1888, Voorhees married Frances "Fanny" Belle Vajen, the daughter of a prominent Indianapolis businessman. They were the parents of a daughter, Anna Belle.

Political offices
Preceded by Thomas H. Brents	Delegate to the United States House of Representatives from Washington Territory; 1885-1889	Succeeded by John B. Allen
