= Covington Courthouse Square Historic District =

Historic district in Indiana, United States

- U.S. National Register of Historic Places
- U.S. Historic district
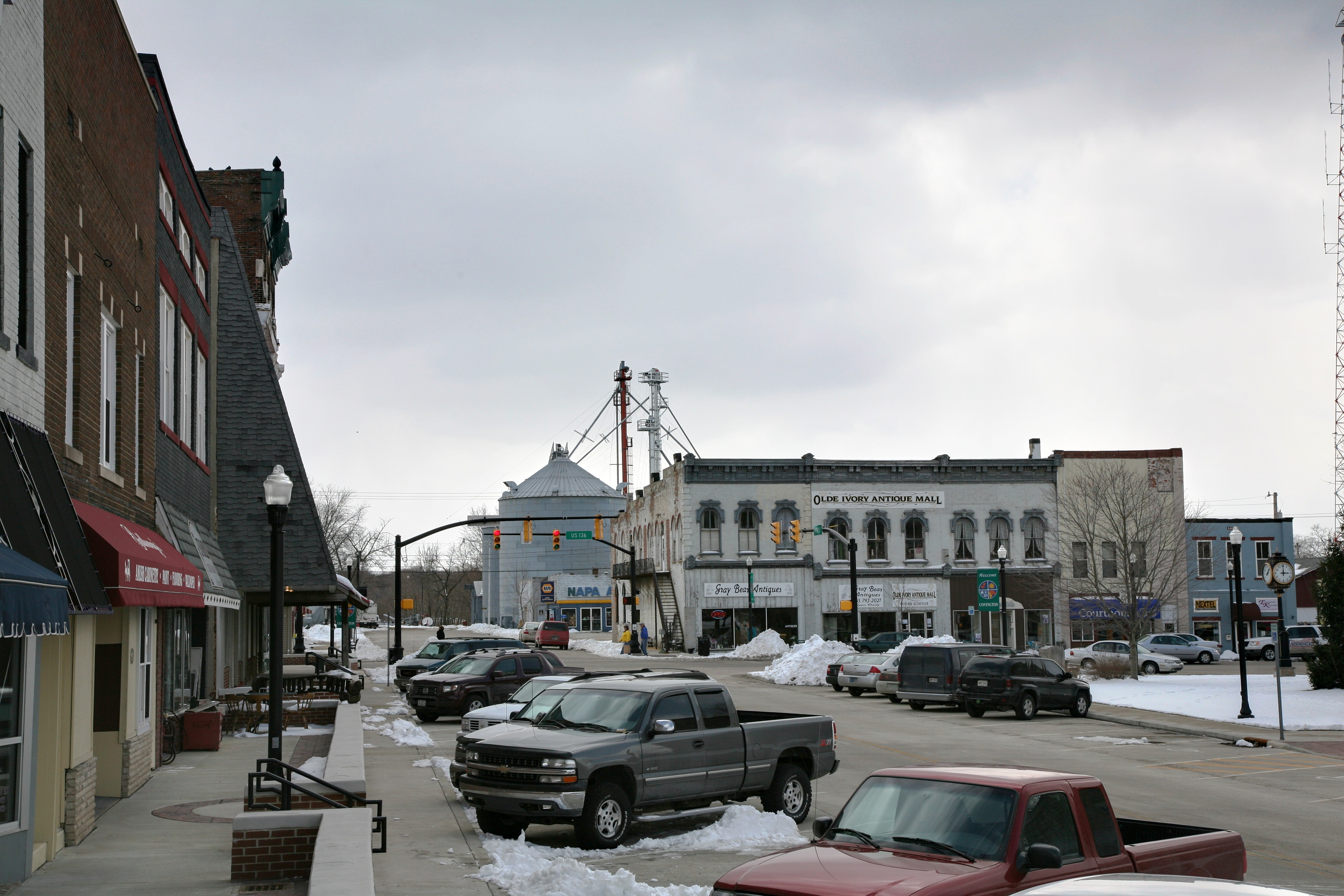
- Covington Town Square, March 2008

- Location within Fountain County, Indiana Location within Indiana Location within the United States
- Location: Roughly bounded by 3rd St. & alleys N. of Washington, E. of 4th & S. of Liberty Sts., Covington, Indiana
- Coordinates: 40°08′13″N 87°23′49″W
- Area: 5.75 acres (2.33 ha)
- Architectural style: Italianate, Gothic Revival, Romanesque Revival, Neoclassical, Art Deco
- NRHP reference No.: 15000593
- Added to NRHP: September 14, 2015

Covington Courthouse Square Historic District is a national historic district located at Covington, Indiana. The district encompasses 23 contributing buildings in the central business district of Covington. It developed between about 1856 and 1956, and includes notable examples of Gothic Revival, Italianate, Romanesque Revival, Classical Revival, and Art Deco style architecture. Located in the district is the separately listed Fountain County Courthouse. Other notable contributing buildings include the Loeb Building (c. 1870), Old Covington City Building (1903, 1915), First National Bank (1913), Knights of Pythias Building (1894), and Covington Post Office (1956).

It was listed on the National Register of Historic Places in 2015.
