= Rena Elrod =

American musician and politician

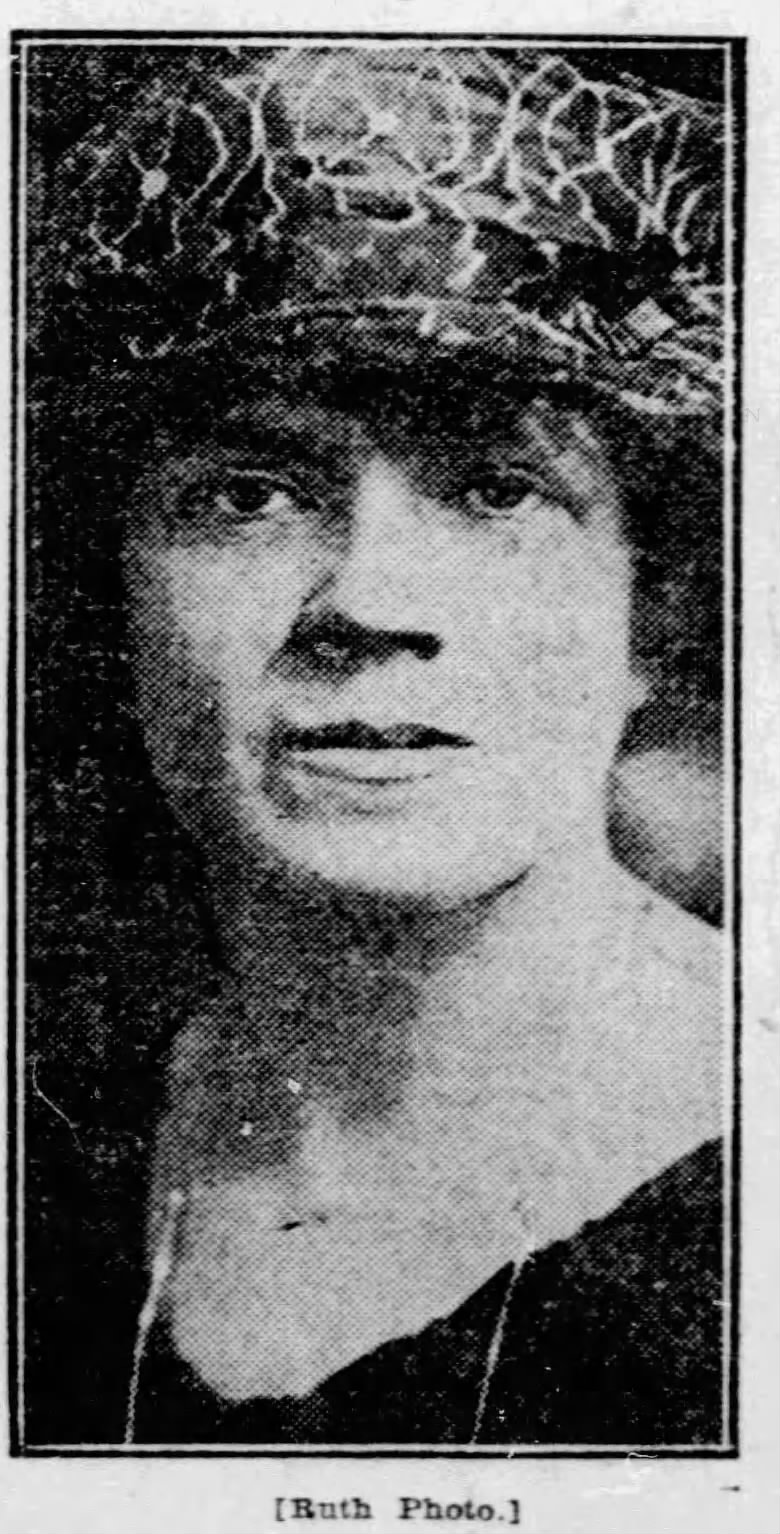
- "Mrs. Allen Elrod; For representative from Twenty-fifth district, Chicago—Ruth Studio Photo" [As captioned in March 9, 1924 issue of Chicago Tribune]

Member of the Illinois House of Representatives from the 25th district
- In office 1924–1929

Personal details
- Born: Rena Linn; September 19, 1872
- Died: July 12, 1950 (aged 77) Chicago, Illinois, U.S.
- Party: Republican
- Spouse: Allen M. Elrod (m. 1898)

Rena Elrod (née Linn; September 19, 1872 – July 12, 1950), known alternately as Representative Allen Elrod, Mrs. Rena Elrod, and—especially during the decade preceding her entry into electoral politics—Mrs. Allen Elrod and Mrs. Allen M. Elrod, was a musician and state legislator in the United States. She was a leader of women's clubs. A Republican, she won a seat in the Illinois House of Representatives after a recount in 1924, thus becoming just the second woman elected to that body, where she would serve for three consecutive terms.

== Early life and career ==
Born Rena Linn in Attica, Indiana, on September 19, 1872, Elrod was one of at least four children born to Mrs. Elizabeth Linn. A graduate of the local high school, Elrod, according to her 1927 Illinois Blue Book entry, received a "common school and musical education, following music as a profession". (Note: Unofrtunately, this somewhat vaguely worded Blue Book entry offers not the slightest clue as to where or when—much less in what capacity (e.g. instrumentalist, vocalist, composer, or conductor)—Elrod might have put to use this education. For its part, the voluminous reportage documenting the Chicago—i.e. politically engaged—portion of Elrod's life makes no mention whatsoever of any such preceding chapter.)

== Personal life and death ==
On September 1, 1898, in Milwaukee, Wisconsin, Rena Linn married former musician Allen M. Elrod. Within a year, they had relocated to Chicago, and by no later than 1914, they were residing at 4852 Pensacola Avenue, on Chicago's West Side, as they would for the remainder of their lives.

Elrod died on July 12, 1950, aged 77, at Lutheran Deaconess Hospital in Chicago. She was survived by her husband, her sister, Mrs. Ida Cooley, and her brother Alfred Linn.

== See also ==
- Lottie Holman O’Neill
- Katherine Hancock Goode
- Florence Fifer Bohrer
- Flora Cheney
