= Marshall M. Milford House =

Historic house in Indiana, United States

- U.S. National Register of Historic Places
- U.S. Historic district – Contributing property
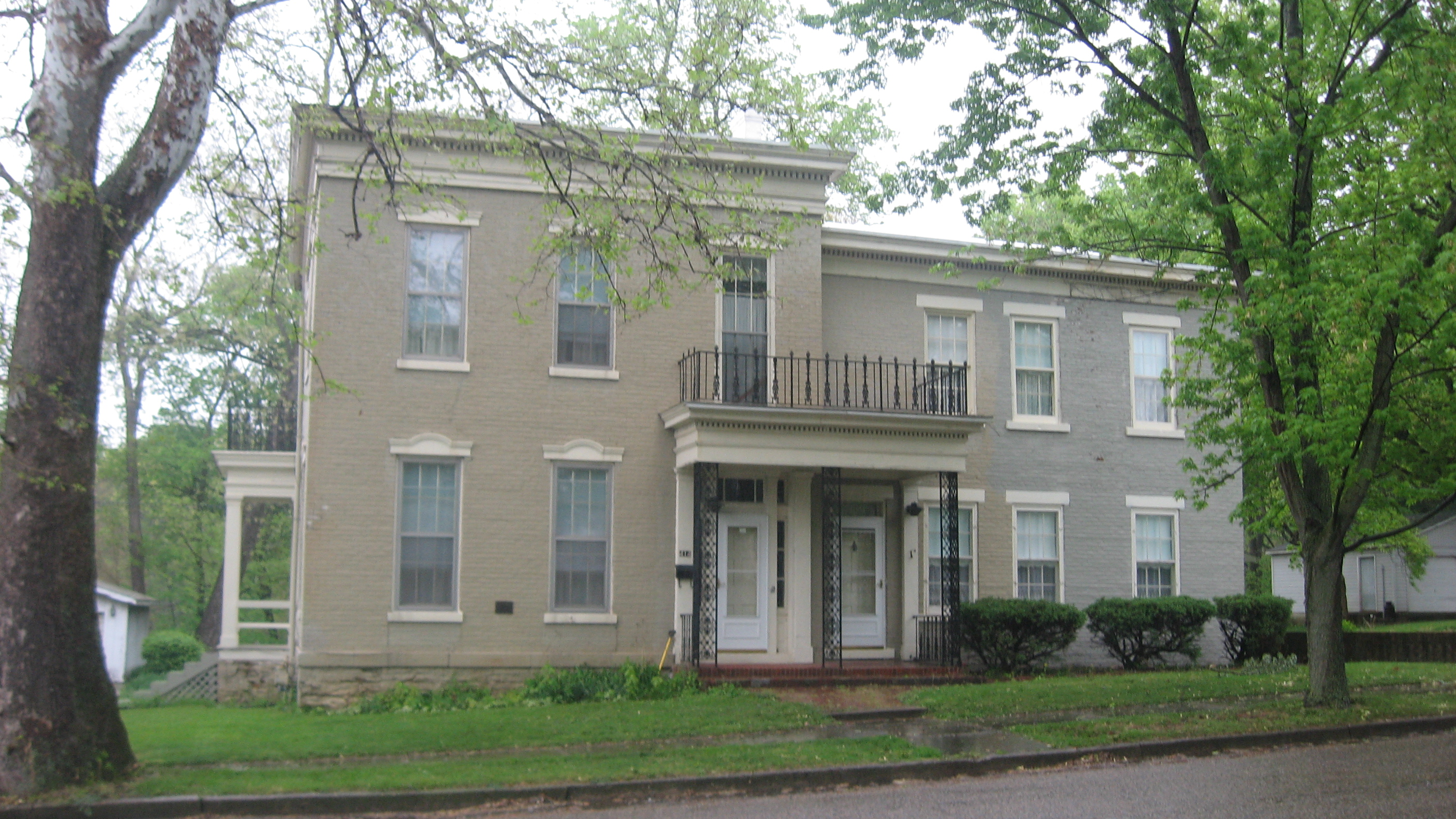
- Marshall M. Milford House, April 2012

- Location within Indiana
- Location: 414 E. Main St., Attica, Indiana
- Coordinates: 40°17′33″N 87°14′41″W
- Area: less than one acre
- Built: 1845, c. 1855
- Architectural style: Greek Revival, Federal
- NRHP reference No.: 88003037
- Added to NRHP: January 26, 1989

Marshall M. Milford House, also known as the Milford-Miller-Kerkhove House, is a historic home located at Attica, Indiana. It is a two-story brick structure that was built in three sections: a two-story east wing with simple Federal style detailing was built in 1845; a west wing with Greek Revival elements was added in about 1855; and a one-story kitchen wing added later in the 1800s.

It was listed on the National Register of Historic Places in 1989. It is located in the Attica Main Street Historic District.
