= Old East Historic District =

Historic district in Indiana, United States

- U.S. National Register of Historic Places
- U.S. Historic district
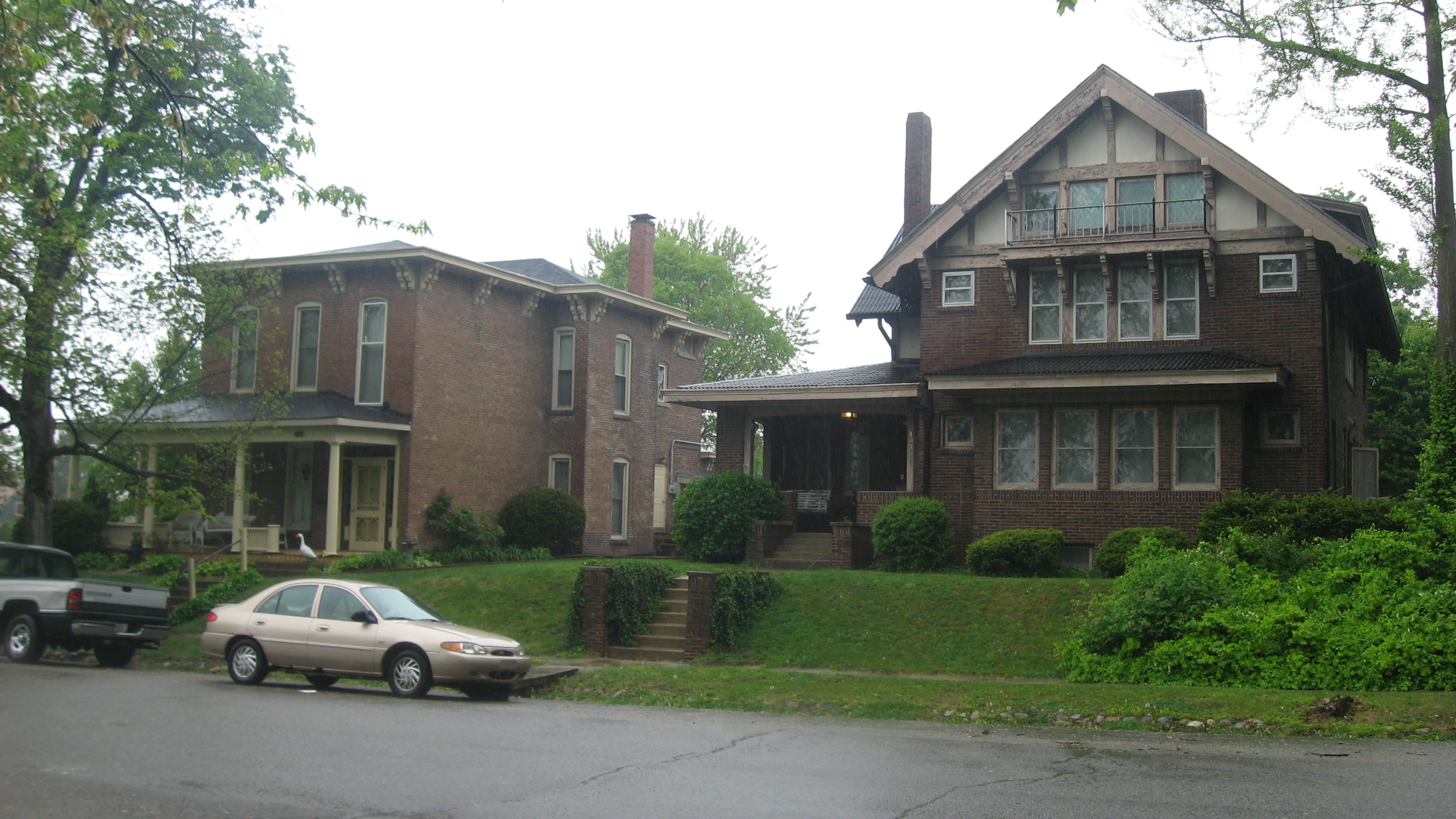
- Old East Historic District, April 2012

- Location within Fountain County, Indiana Location within Indiana Location within the United States
- Location: 400 block of E. Washington St. and the 400 and 500 blocks of E. Monroe St., Attica, Indiana
- Coordinates: 40°17′26″N 87°14′56″W
- Area: 12 acres (4.9 ha)
- Architect: Johnson, Louis; Perkins, Charles
- Architectural style: Late Victorian, Tudor Revival, Italianate
- NRHP reference No.: 90001784
- Added to NRHP: November 28, 1990

Old East Historic District is a national historic district located at Attica, Indiana. The district encompasses 43 contributing buildings and two contributing structures in a predominantly residential section of Attica. It developed between about 1865 and 1930, and includes notable examples of Late Victorian, Tudor Revival, and Italian Villa style architecture. Notable contributing buildings include the Holmes House (1877), Meharry House (1908), Colvert House (1901), and McDermond House (1897).

It was listed on the National Register of Historic Places in 1990.
