= Eugene Savage =

American painter and sculptor (1883–1978)

Eugene Francis Savage
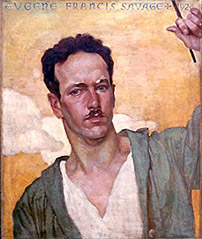
- Self portrait of Eugene Francis Savage, 1924
- Born: March 29, 1883; Covington, Indiana
- Died: October 19, 1978 (aged 95); Woodbury, Connecticut
- Education: Chicago Art Institute, American Academy in Rome, Yale University
- Known for: Painting, murals
- Movement: Neorenaissance; Art Deco

Island Feast, mural by Savage, Matson Navigation Company

Eugene Francis Savage (March 29, 1883 – October 19, 1978) was an American painter and sculptor known for his murals in the manner made official under the Works Projects Administration. He also is known for his work on the Bailey Fountain in Grand Army Plaza, Brooklyn, New York, the mural Videbimus Lumen in the Butler Library of Columbia University, and the Alma Mater mural featured in the Sterling Memorial Library on the campus of Yale University.

== Biography ==
Savage was born in Covington, Indiana. In 1912, while studying at the Chicago Art Institute, he won the Rome Prize in painting, enabling him to study at the American Academy in Rome, where he received a bachelor of arts degree in 1915 and became a Fellow of the Academy. Later he received Bachelor of Arts (1924) and Master of Fine Arts from Yale University. Savage subsequently taught at the Yale School of Art and Architecture for twenty-eight years, where he was the Leffingwell Professor of Painting & Design.

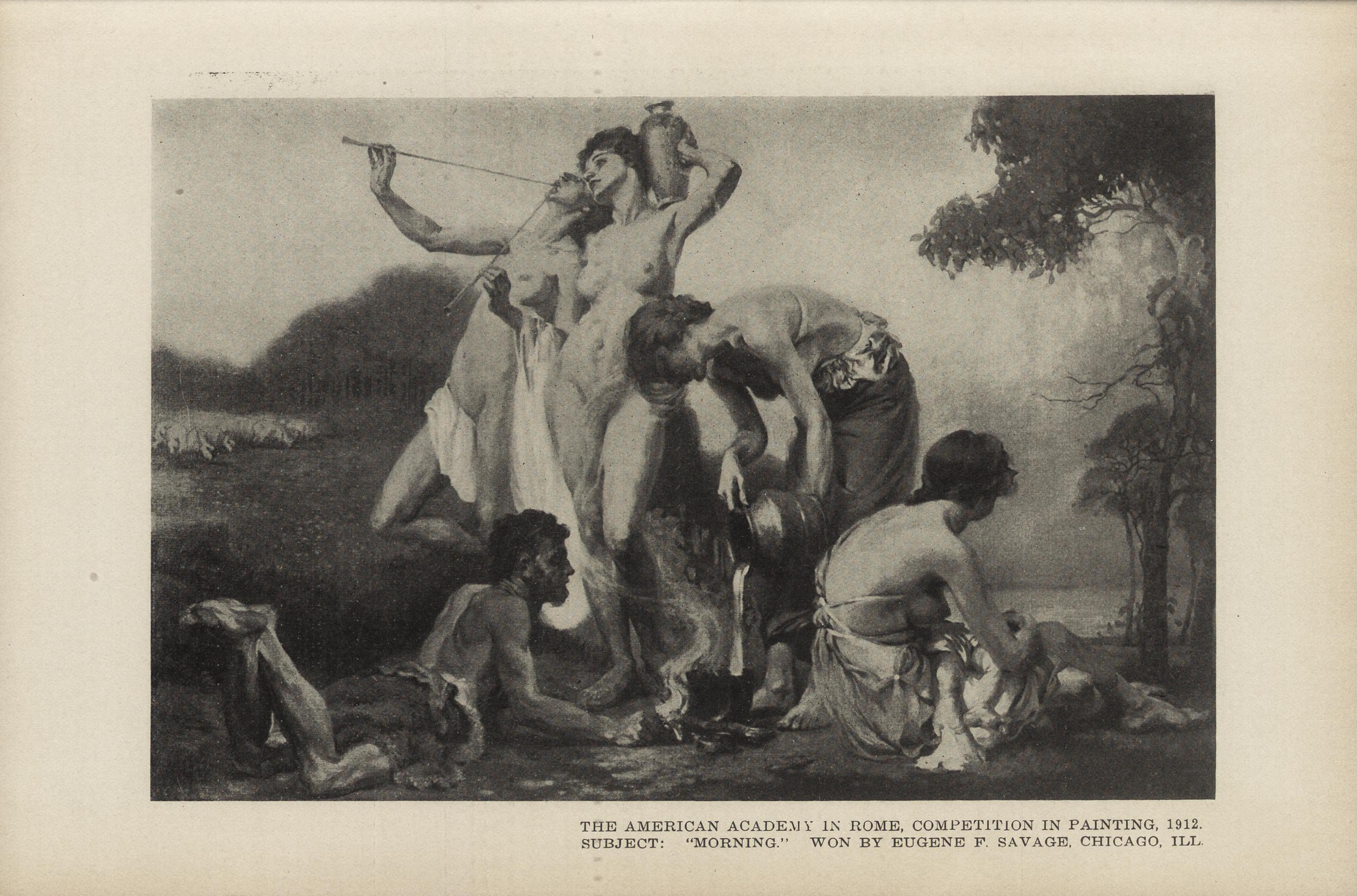
Morning, the work with which Savage won the Rome Prize in painting.

Savage's training in Early Renaissance techniques strongly influence his style. He was also strongly influenced by Thomas Hart Benton. Other contemporary influences on his public art were his Latin American contemporaries Diego Rivera and José Clemente Orozco.

Savage's influence was extended by his service on high-profile arts committees. While acting as a member of the Fine Arts committee of the American Academy in Rome, he ensured, though not a member of the jury, that a generation of winning artists were painting in the manner of Thomas Hart Benton or Savage himself. He became an associate member of the National Academy of Design, 1924 and National Academician, 1926. Savage also served on the U.S. Commission of Fine Arts from 1933 to 1941 and was a member of the American Academy of Arts and Letters, to which he was elected in 1936.

== Works ==
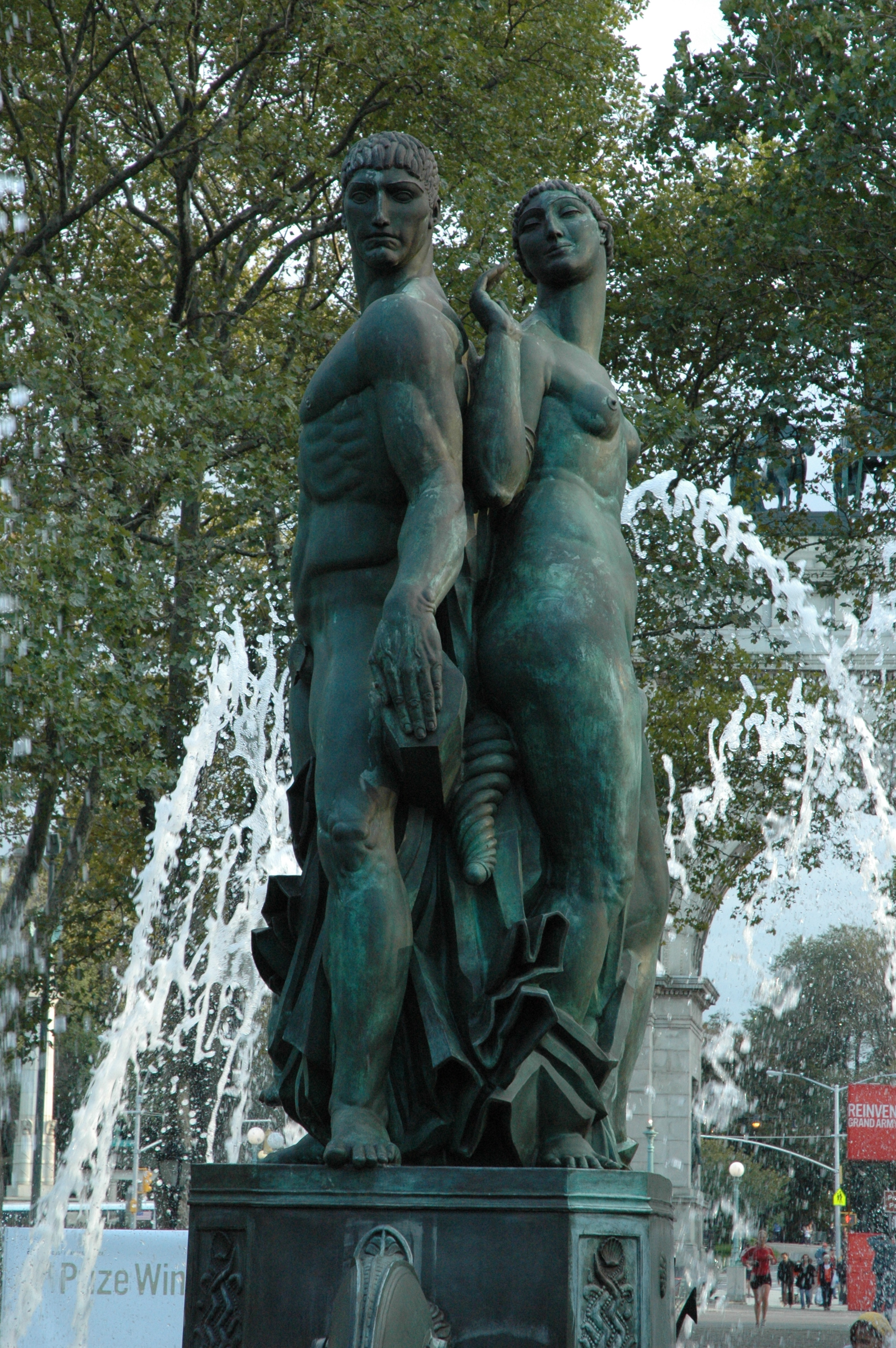
Bailey Fountain, Grand Army Plaza, Brooklyn, New York, 1932

Savage was commissioned by the Matson Navigation Company to paint nine 4 by 8 foot Hawaiian-themed murals in Hawaii. They were completed in 1940, but never installed in the company's ships, which had been converted to troopships. In 1948, lithographs based on these murals were used as menu covers on Matson's flagship, SS Lurline.

In 1935 and 1953 Savage visited Florida, where he painted the experience of the Seminole in their Everglades, taking note of the intrusion of modern civilization into what seemed to be a Garden of Eden pastoral existence. These paintings were done at the same time the effort was under way to create the Everglades National Park

Murals by Savage are on the campuses of Purdue, Columbia and Yale Universities. At Yale, he oversaw the decorative painting of Sterling Memorial Library and painted the library's Alma Mater mural. His work also features in government buildings in Connecticut, the Elks National Veterans Memorial in Chicago, the new Post Office Building (now William Jefferson Clinton Federal Building) in Washington, in Indiana and the renovated Court of Appeals Hall, Albany, New York (1959). He also did the Great Hall murals in the Hall of State at Fair Park for the 1936 Texas Centennial Exposition in Dallas, Texas.

After World War II, Savage designed and installed the colored glass mosaic map at the Epinal American Cemetery in Épinal France. The mosaic depicts American and Allied military operations of Operation Dragoon from the landing in southern France on 15 August 1944 to the junction with Allied Forces advancing from Normandy on 11 September at Sombernon, near Dijon; and their subsequent advances after turning eastward, crossing the Rhine and sweeping across Germany to meet with the spearhead of the U.S. Fifth Army south of the Brenner Pass. The mosaic, 54' feet long and 14' feet high, was designed utilizing data provided by the American Battle Monuments Commission. The map is laid out in perspective as seen from the south; consequently, the lines of the longitude and latitude are tilted to accommodate the map to the proportions of the room. Thus, north is toward the upper right instead of vertically upward. Symbolically, the figures on the semi-circular wall depict the Spirit of Columbia leading the Army, Navy, and Air Forces to the landings on the south coast of France. The final victory is symbolized by the Angel of Victory with laurel branch above the central altar; a group composed of trumpets; the American and French flags emerging from the clouds of war and the outstretched hands of women who offer flowers as tribute to the victors. In the border of the map are the insignia of all military units of division size or larger that participated in ground operations in the region.

The 14' × 4' foot 4 panel oil on board study for the glass mosaic at the Epinal American Cemetery currently hangs at the Military Heritage Collection of North Texas 35 miles north east of Dallas, TX in Nevada, TX.

In other media, he provided illustrations for Coningsby Dawson's Christmas Outside of Eden. In 1938 the Matson Lines commissioned him to paint murals depicting native Hawaiian life, which were later adapted for menus and other memorabilia.
