= Brady Street Historic District =

Historic district in Indiana, United States

- U.S. National Register of Historic Places
- U.S. Historic district
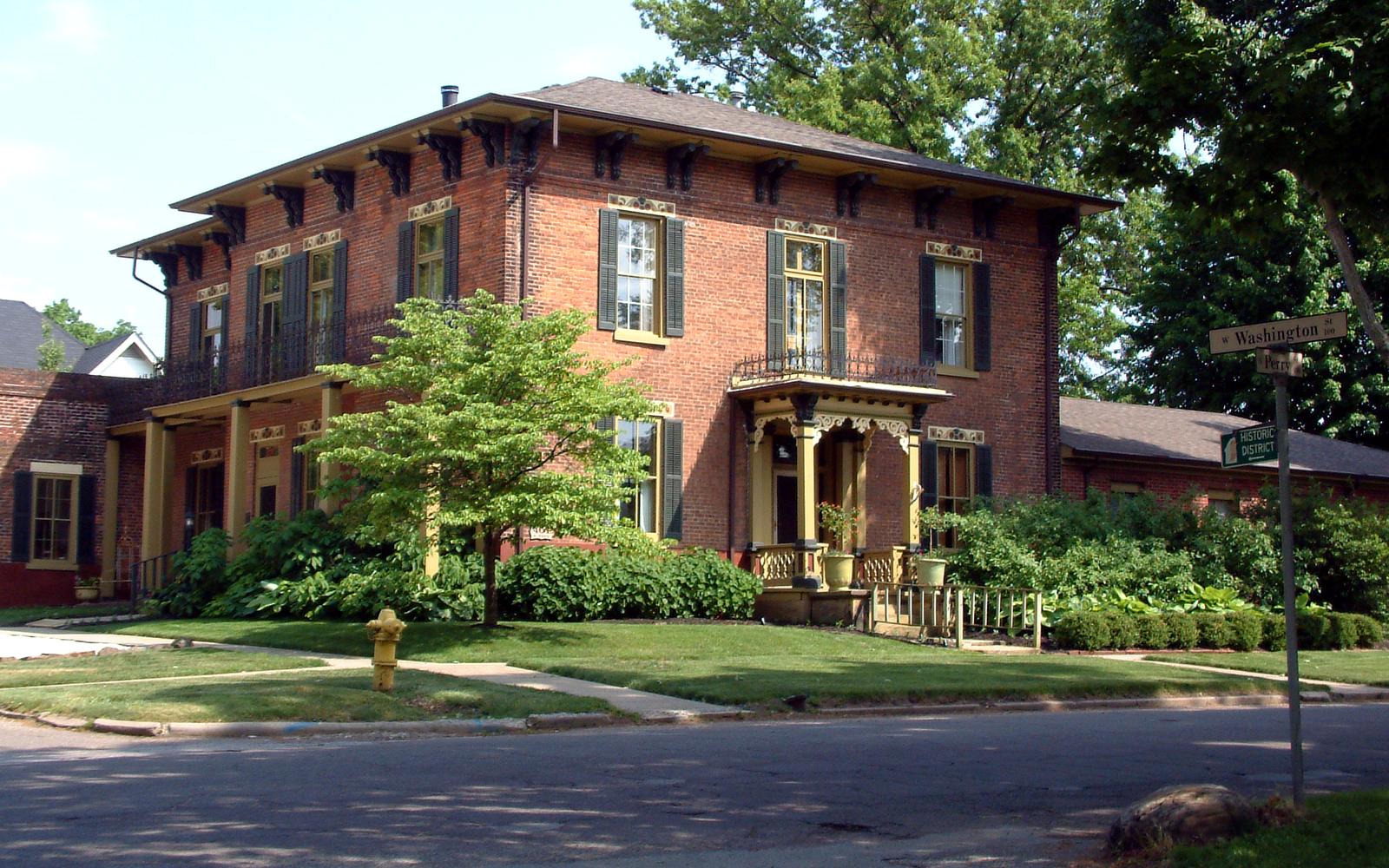
- Schlosser House, May 2007

- Location within Fountain County, Indiana Location within Indiana Location within the United States
- Location: Roughly bounded by S. Perry, E. Jackson, S. Council and E. Pike Sts., Attica, Indiana
- Coordinates: 40°17′26″N 87°14′56″W
- Area: 27 acres (11 ha)
- Architectural style: Greek Revival, Gothic Revival, Italian Villa
- NRHP reference No.: 90001785
- Added to NRHP: December 7, 1990

Brady Street Historic District is a national historic district in Attica, Indiana, United States. The district encompasses 108 contributing buildings, nine contributing structures, and four contributing objects in a predominantly residential section of Attica. It developed between about 1840 and 1930, and includes notable examples of Greek Revival, Gothic Revival, and Italian villa style architecture. Notable contributing buildings include the Carnegie library (1904), Schlosser House (1840s), Catholic Church (1891) and rectory (1895), McClaflin House (1904), and Greenwood House (1877).

It was listed on the National Register of Historic Places in 1990.
