= Attica Main Street Historic District =

Historic district in Indiana, United States

- U.S. National Register of Historic Places
- U.S. Historic district
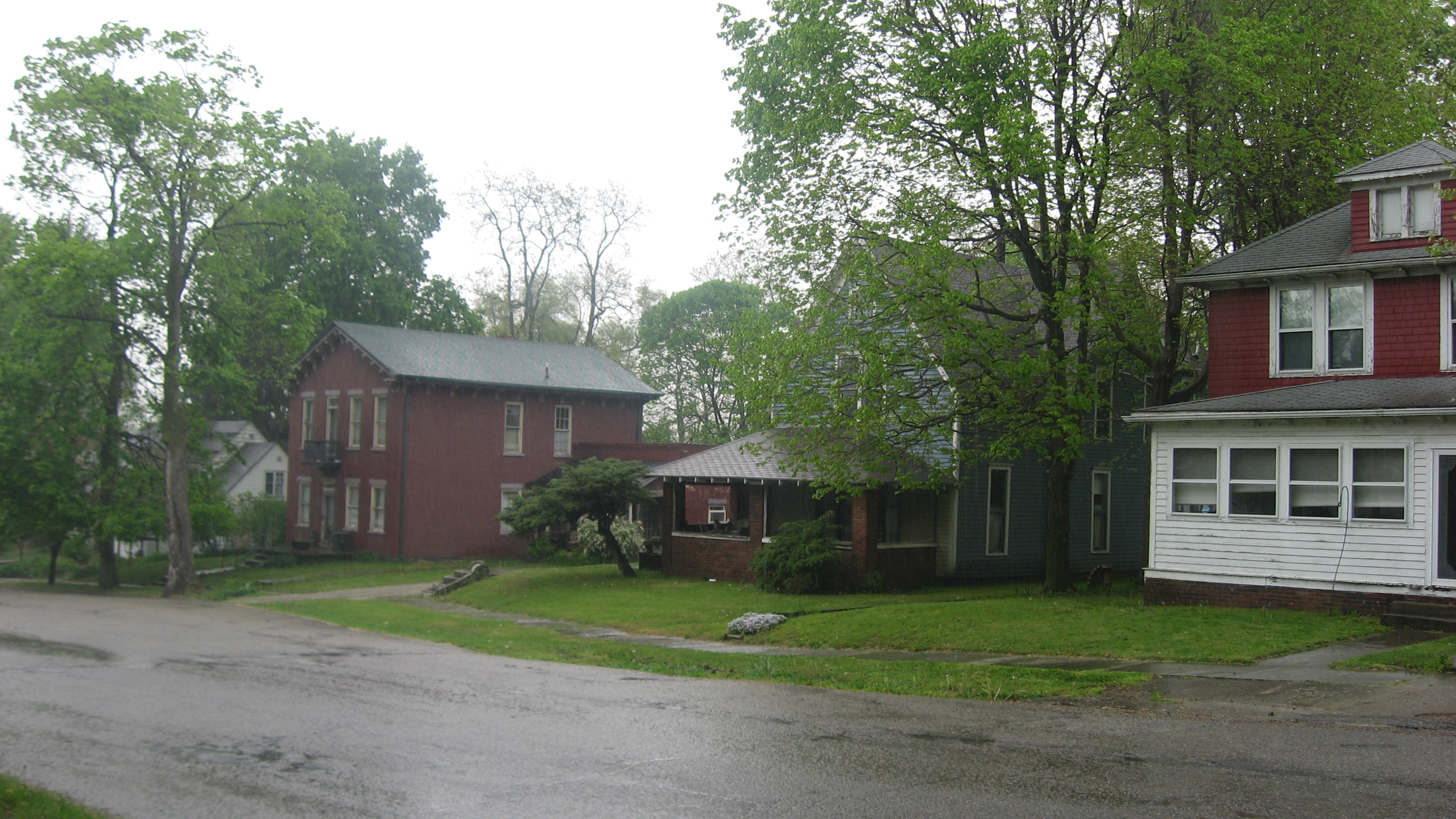
- Attica Main Street Historic District April 2012

- Location within Fountain County, Indiana Location within Indiana Location within the United States
- Location: Roughly bounded by Jackson, Brady, Short and Canada Sts., Attica, Indiana
- Coordinates: 40°17′33″N 87°14′47″W
- Area: 8 acres (3.2 ha)
- Architect: Brown, Norman; Johnson, Louis
- Architectural style: Late Victorian, Mid 19th Century Revival, Federal
- NRHP reference No.: 94000581
- Added to NRHP: June 10, 1994

Attica Main Street Historic District is a national historic district located at Attica, Indiana. The district encompasses 36 contributing buildings, 1 contributing site, and 2 contributing structures in a predominantly residential section of Attica. It developed between about 1840 and 1940, and includes notable examples of Late Victorian, Greek Revival, and Federal style architecture. Located in the district is the separately listed Marshall M. Milford House. Other notable contributing resources include McDonald Park, Parker-Clark House, Attica Presbyterian Church (1849), Ziegler House (c. 1834), Rolphing-Colvert Home, "Ladies Library" (1889), former Church of Christ (1891), and Attica Methodist Church (1921).

It was listed on the National Register of Historic Places in 1994.
