= Fountain County Clerk's Building =

- U.S. National Register of Historic Places
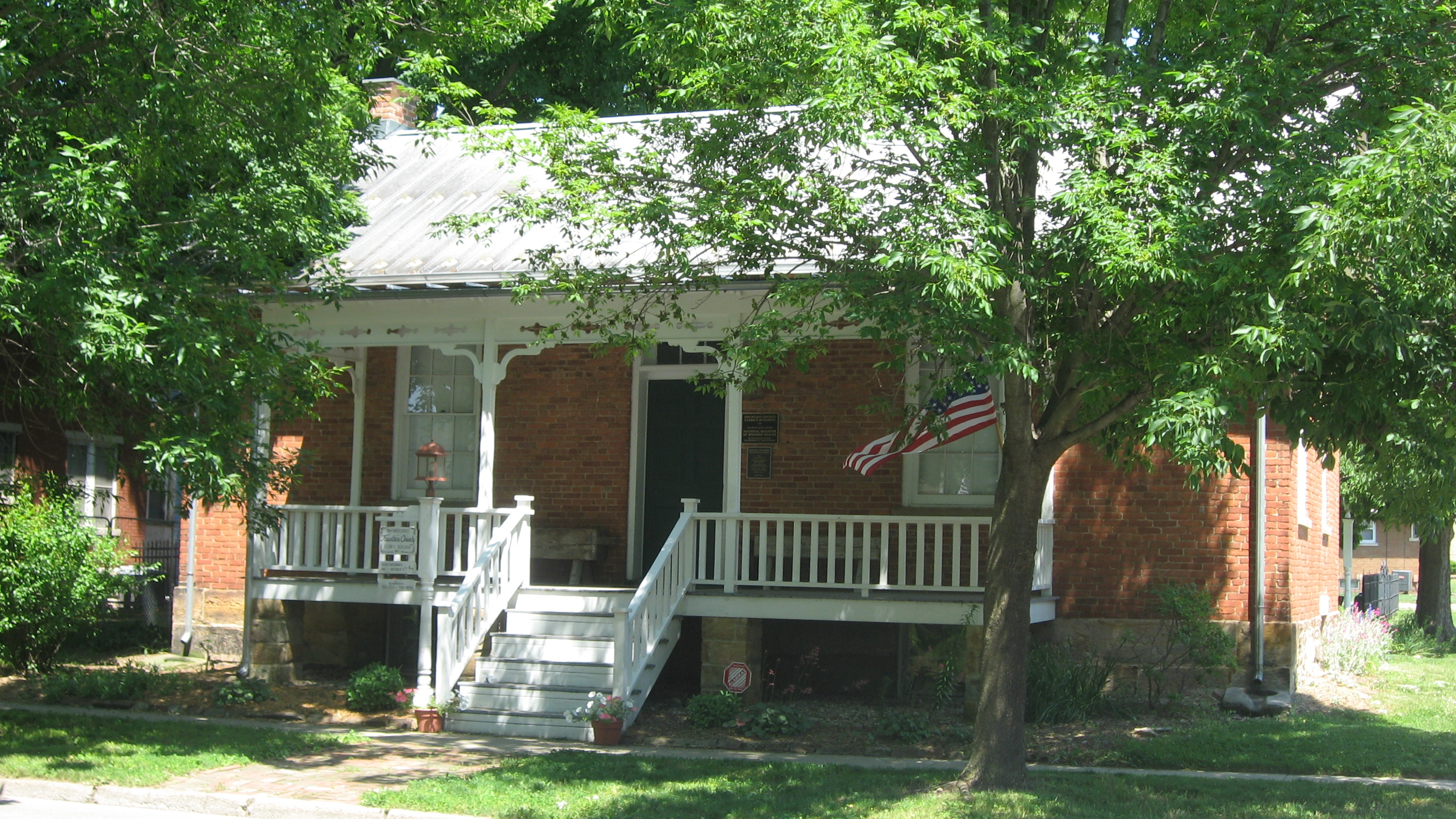
- Fountain County Clerk's Building, May 2012

- Location within Fountain County, Indiana Location within Indiana Location within the United States
- Location: 516 4th St., Covington, Indiana
- Coordinates: 40°8′20″N 87°23′49″W
- Area: less than one acre
- Built: 1842, 1859
- Architectural style: Federal, Double pile
- NRHP reference No.: 02000692
- Added to NRHP: June 27, 2002

Fountain County Clerk's Building, also known as the Lew Wallace Law Office, is a historic government office building located at Covington, Indiana. It was built in 1842, and is a one-story, double pile, Federal style red brick building. It has a side gable roof and sits on a stone foundation. The front facade features a nearly full-width front porch with decorative scrollwork. It housed the office of the county clerk until 1859, when the building was sold and moved to its present location and the clerk's offices were moved to the third Fountain County Courthouse. From 1849 to 1853, the building housed the law office of Lew Wallace (1827–1901).

It was listed on the National Register of Historic Places in 2002.
