= Logan Township, Fountain County, Indiana =

Logan Township
- Township
- Location of Logan Township in Fountain County
- Coordinates: 40°17′15″N 87°12′39″W
- Country: United States
- State: Indiana
- County: Fountain

Government
  - Type: Indiana township

Area
  - Total: 22.62 sq mi (58.6 km^{2})
  - Land: 22.23 sq mi (57.6 km^{2})
  - Water: 0.38 sq mi (0.98 km^{2})
- Elevation: 679 ft (207 m)

Population (2020)
  - Total: 3,377
  - Density: 151.9/sq mi (58.65/km^{2})
- FIPS code: 18-44622
- GNIS feature ID: 453579

Logan Township is one of eleven townships in Fountain County, Indiana, United States. As of the 2020 census, its population was 3,377 and it contained 1,641 housing units.

Historical population
Census	Pop.	Note	%±
1890	2,825		—
1900	3,536		25.2%
1910	3,871		9.5%
1920	3,876		0.1%
1930	4,195		8.2%
1940	4,256		1.5%
1950	4,327		1.7%
1960	4,902		13.3%
1970	4,831		−1.4%
1980	4,456		−7.8%
1990	4,064		−8.8%
2000	3,968		−2.4%
2010	3,672		−7.5%
2020	3,377		−8.0%
Source: US Decennial Census

== History ==
The Bethel Church and Graveyard was listed on the National Register of Historic Places in 1995.

== Geography ==
According to the 2010 census, the township has a total area of 22.62 square miles (58.6 km^{2}), of which 22.23 square miles (57.6 km^{2}) (or 98.28%) is land and 0.38 square miles (0.98 km^{2}) (or 1.68%) is water. It contains the town of Attica, which is near the banks of the Wabash River and which has a population of about 3,200 people.

U.S. Route 41, Indiana State Road 28 and Indiana State Road 55 enter the township from Warren County, across the river to the west; at this point they all share the same route. In passing through Attica, U.S. 41 and State Road 55 go south, while State Road 28 continues east. A Norfolk Southern Railway line also crosses the river into the township; the line continues east-northeast near the river, carrying about 45 freight trains each day.

Map of Logan Township

=== Cemeteries ===
The township contains five cemeteries. Riverside and Saint Francis of Xavier are on the south edge of Attica, while Hatton is on the southeast side of town. Ruppert lies further to the southeast outside of town, and Clark is in the far northeast corner of the township.
