= Daniel W. Voorhees =

American politician (1827–1897)

Daniel Voorhees
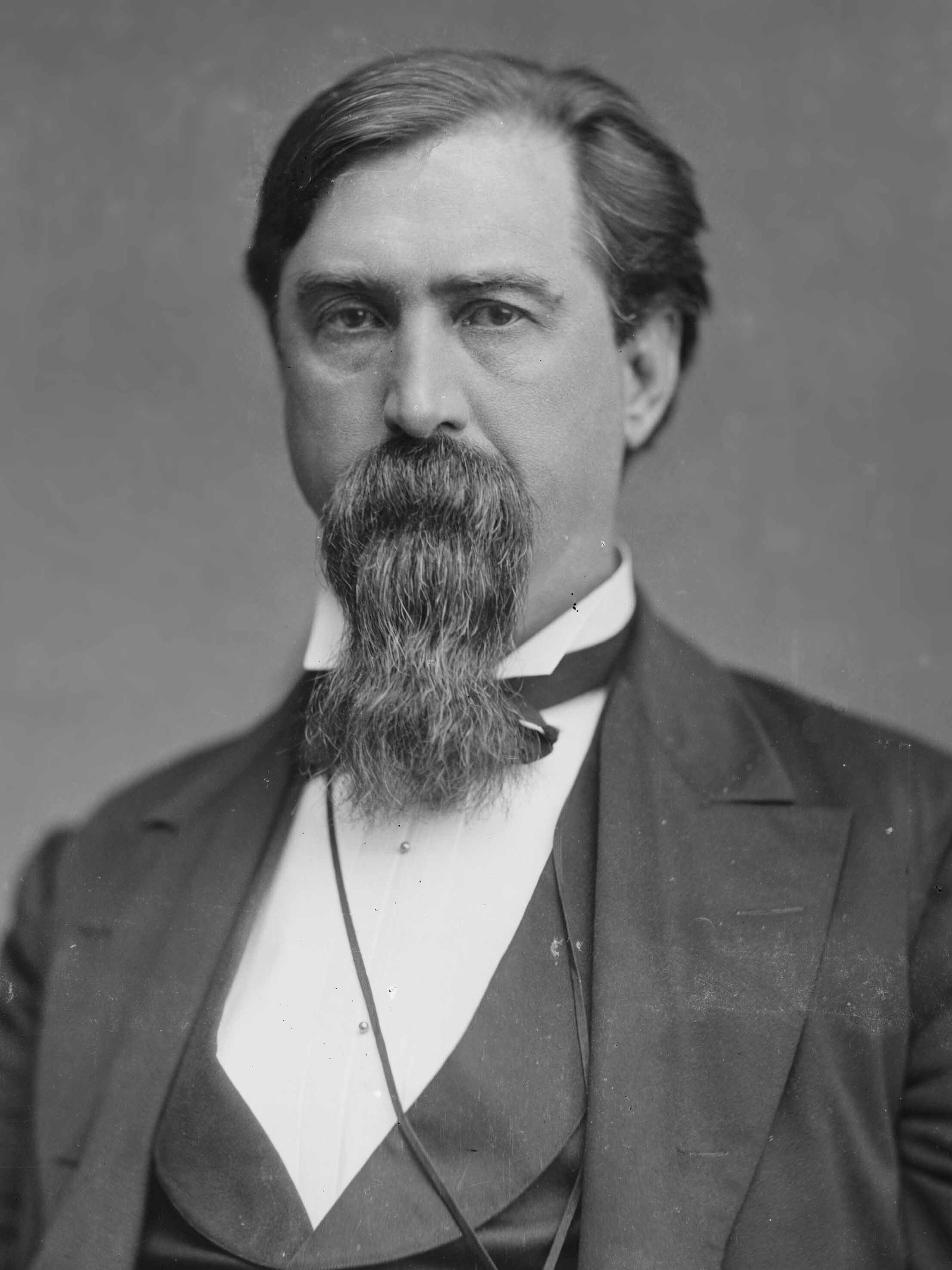
- Voorhees, 1865–1880

Chair of the Senate Finance Committee
- In office March 4, 1893 – March 3, 1895
- Preceded by: Justin Morrill
- Succeeded by: Justin Morrill

United States Senator from Indiana
- In office November 6, 1877 – March 3, 1897
- Preceded by: Oliver Morton
- Succeeded by: Charles W. Fairbanks

Member of the U.S. House of Representatives from Indiana
- In office March 4, 1869 – March 3, 1873
- Preceded by: John Coburn
- Succeeded by: Morton C. Hunter
- Constituency: 6th district
- In office March 4, 1861 – February 23, 1866
- Preceded by: John G. Davis
- Succeeded by: Henry D. Washburn
- Constituency: 7th district

Personal details
- Born: Daniel Wolsey Voorhees; September 26, 1827 Liberty Township, Ohio, U.S.
- Died: April 10, 1897 (aged 69) Washington, D.C., U.S.
- Resting place: Highland Lawn Cemetery
- Party: Democratic
- Spouse: Anna Hardesty (m. 1850; died 1887)
- Children: 5, including Charles
- Education: Indiana Asbury University (BA)

Daniel Wolsey Voorhees (September 26, 1827 – April 10, 1897) was an American lawyer and politician who served as a United States Senator from Indiana from 1877 to 1897. He was the leader of the Democratic Party and an anti-war Copperhead during the American Civil War.

== Childhood and early career ==
Voorhees was born in Liberty Township, Butler County, Ohio, of Dutch and Scotch-Irish descent. He was the son of Stephen Pieter Voorhees and Rachel Elliott. During his infancy his parents moved to Fountain County, Indiana, near Covington. In 1849, he graduated from Indiana Asbury University (now DePauw University) in Greencastle, Indiana. He then studied law, was admitted to the bar in 1850, and began to practice in Covington, Indiana. In 1857, he moved to Terre Haute, where he continued to practice law. From 1858 to 1861, Voorhees was U.S. District Attorney for Indiana.

== Representative ==
From 1861 to 1866 and 1869 to 1873, Voorhees was a Democratic representative in Congress. During the American Civil War he was an anti-war Copperhead, albeit not as radical as Clement Vallandigham. He was accused of membership in the Knights of the Golden Circle, an organization promoting Southern conquest of much of Central America and the Caribbean as a pro-slavery empire.

Historian Kenneth Stampp has captured the Copperhead spirit in his depiction of Voorhees of Indiana:

There was an earthy quality in Voorhees, "the tall sycamore of the Wabash." On the stump his hot temper, passionate partisanship, and stirring eloquence made an irresistible appeal to the western Democracy. His bitter cries against protective tariffs and national banks, his intense race prejudice, his suspicion of the eastern Yankee, his devotion to personal liberty, his defense of the Constitution and state rights faithfully reflected the views of his constituents. Like other Jacksonian agrarians he resented the political and economic revolution then in progress. Voorhees idealized a way of life which he thought was being destroyed by the current rulers of his country. His bold protests against these dangerous trends made him the idol of the Democracy of the Wabash Valley. [Stampp, p. 211]

After the Civil War, Voorhees was a staunch opponent of Black civil and political rights. He believed that whites' temporary loss of total political control in places where they were not in the majority made them "as very a slave in the hands of a brutal overseer as any negro ever driven in a cotton-field, and that he had no more power under existing laws to protect his personal freedom than an African bondsman on the auction-block before the war...the liberation of one race had been followed by the enslavement of another."

Voorhees complained repeatedly about what he perceived as the North's unjust treatment of the vanquished South, claiming it would be a challenge to find a group in history treated worse than white Southerners during Reconstruction.

In his "Plunder of the Eleven States" speech made to the U.S. House of Representatives on March 23, 1872, Voorhees outlined the crimes he perceived to be committed upon the South by the North:

From turret to foundation you tore down the government of twelve States. You left not one stone upon another. You not only destroyed their local laws, but you trampled upon their ruins. You called Conventions to frame new Constitutions for these old States. You not only said who should be elected to rule over these States, but you said who should elect them. You fixed the quality... of the voters. You purged the ballot box of intelligence and virtue, and in their stead you placed the most ignorant and unqualified...in the world to rule over these people....You clung to her throat; you battered her features out of shape and recognition, determined that your party should have undisputed possession and enjoyment of her offices, her honors, and her substance. Then bound hand and foot you handed her over to the rapacity of robbers....

There is no form of ruin to which she has not fallen a prey, no curse with which she has not been baptized, no cup of humiliation and suffering her people have not drained to the dregs. There she stands the result of your handiwork bankrupt in money, ruined in credit... her prosperity blighted at home and abroad, without peace, happiness, or hope. There she stands with her skeleton frame admonishing all the world of the loathsome consequences of a government fashioned in hate and fanaticism, and founded upon the ignorant and vicious... Her sins may have been many and deep, and the color of scarlet, yet they will become as white as snow in comparison with those you have committed against her in the hour of her helplessness and distress.

I challenge the darkest annals of the human race for a parallel to the robberies which have been perpetrated on these twelve American States. Had you sown seeds of kindness and good will they would long ere this have blossomed into prosperity and peace. Had you sown seeds of honor, you would have reaped a golden harvest of contentment and obedience. Had you extended your charities and your justice to a distressed people you would have awakened a grateful affection in return. But as you planted in hate and nurtured in corruption so have been the fruits which you have gathered.

== Senator ==
Throughout the 1880s, during the Presidencies of James A. Garfield and Chester Arthur, Voorhees and his fellow Indiana Senator Benjamin Harrison both advocated increasing America's trade and interaction with the United Kingdom. Voorhees viewed Britain as a large market with which America could do business and with whom America had much in common.

== Personality ==
Voorhees was widely liked on both sides of the aisle in the Senate. He had struck up a warm friendship with Abraham Lincoln in their circuit-riding days before the war, and that friendship outlasted their political differences and to the end of Lincoln's life. President Ulysses Grant also got along well with Voorhees, and it was said of President Chester Alan Arthur that Voorhees had as much influence with him as any Republican could hope to have. Republican senator George F. Hoar of Massachusetts, who rarely agreed with his Indiana colleague about anything, declared him "a very kind-hearted man indeed, always willing to do a kindness to any of his associates, or to any person in trouble. If he could not be relied on to protect the Treasury against claims of doubtful validity, when they were urged by persons in need, or who in any way excited his sympathy, it ought to be said in defence of him, that he would have been quite as willing to relieve them to the extent of his power from his private resources."

That was very likely true. Stories abounded about Voorhees's freehandedness with anyone telling a hard luck story. "Uncle Dan is the most unsophisticated person in the use of money you ever saw," an old friend commented in 1894. "He will lend or give away a pocketful of money in a day, and at night he will not have the least idea what he has done with it. I have been with him when he would feel in his pocket and suddenly discover that he had not enough to pay his restaurant bill or buy a newspaper." After Voorhees's death, Senator Vest of Missouri declared that if every one for whom Voorhees did a good deed "would but bring a single leaf to his grave and lay it there, the Indiana Senator would sleep tonight beneath a mountain of foliage." That same generosity meant that Voorhees rarely met a pension bill that he could oppose. The Treasury, as far as he was concerned, was open to whoever needed help. As Vest once told him, Voorhees "would have put Aladdin's Lamp in the hands of a receiver within thirty days."

== Senator ==
Voorhees served in the U.S. Senate from 1877 to 1897. He was a member of the powerful Finance Committee throughout his service in the Senate, and his first speech in that body was a defence of the free coinage of silver and a plea for the preservation of the full legal tender value of greenback currency. He had an active part in bringing about the building of the new Congressional Library. On tariff matters, he voted dutifully with his party, but he was no enthusiast for free trade, and his frankness could be embarrassing, at least from a Democrat. "Why, the cow and the goose are the greatest fools in the world," he blurted out once, "except the man who thinks that a tariff can be laid without protection." Voorhees made a fascinating speaker, if somewhat careless in his use of facts. "The readers of the News are aware that it has been repeatedly forced, by the variety and brilliance of his misinformation, to compliment Senator Voorhees on the unfailing inaccuracy of his historical statements, whether political, social, or literary," an Indianapolis newspaper remarked. He was widely known as an effective advocate, especially in jury trials. In allusion to his unusual stature he was called "the Tall Sycamore of the Wabash."

In 1893, Voorhees came in for serious controversy when President Grover Cleveland called Congress into extra session to repeal the silver purchase clause of the 1890 Sherman Act. As chair of the Senate Finance Committee, the senior senator from Indiana could prevent action, and three years before, he had stood among the leading supporters for an unlimited coinage of silver. His views, in fact, had not changed. He remained, to the end of his days, a believer in bimetallism: the use of both silver and gold to back up the United States currency. But Indiana was less friendly to an inflated currency than it had been twenty years before, and manufacturers and industrialists were much more decisive in their demand for a gold standard. From members of the Indiana House delegation, Voorhees found an intense desire that he do nothing to risk their own political futures, as any blockage of the repeal bill would be sure to do. Finally, the senator had to reckon with the other big issue pending, on which he and the president would have to part company: tariff reduction. Realizing that he would have to pick his fights, and sweetened with great dollops of patronage by the Administration, Voorhees agreed to carry the repeal bill through, and he kept absolute faith. In late October, when a compromise was proposed that would delay the silver purchase act's repeal until July 1, 1894, thirty seven of the forty-four Democratic senators signed a letter endorsing it. Voorhees's name was not among them. He refused to consider any halfway measures, and saw to it that unconditional repeal went through within the month.

Vooorhees delivered his last speech in the Senate in January 1896, a plea on behalf of silver coinage and denouncing the tariff protectionists and centralizers of government power. He meant it as something of a valedictory. His health was in steep decline, and in any case the Indiana legislature had gone heavily Republican, and Democrats' chance of regaining it that fall were slim. The following winter, when the lawmakers assembled, Voorhees was replaced with a Republican, though every Democratic vote went for him.

== Retirement and death ==
Voorhees returned to Indiana, preparing lectures that he intended to deliver on the lyceum circuit, should his health permit, and writing a memoir, "The Public Men of My Times," that he hoped would be completed and would sell, as General Grant's memoirs did; without it, he would be leaving his daughter with no estate at all. Only three sections of it were completed before his death in Washington, D.C., in April 1897 at the age of 69. His generosity or profligacy was such that his estate could not even afford his funeral expenses.

== Bibliography ==
- Stampp, Kenneth M. Indiana Politics during the Civil War (1949)
- Voorhees, Daniel. Forty Years of Oratory (2 vols., Indianapolis, Indiana, 1898), edited by his three sons and his daughter, Harriet C. Voorhees, and with a biographical sketch by T. B. Long.

== See also ==
- Daniel W. Voorhees (bust), a public artwork by American artist James Paxton Voorhees

U.S. House of Representatives
| Preceded by John G. Davis | Member of the U.S. House of Representatives from Indiana's 7th congressional district 1861–1866 | Succeeded by Henry D. Washburn |
| Preceded by John Coburn | Member of the U.S. House of Representatives from Indiana's 6th congressional district 1869–1873 | Succeeded by Morton C. Hunter |
U.S. Senate
| Preceded by Oliver Morton | U.S. Senator (Class 3) from Indiana; 1877–1897; Served alongside: Joseph E. McDonald, Benjamin Harrison, David Turpie | Succeeded by Charles W. Fairbanks |
| Preceded by Timothy O. Howe | Chair of the Senate Library Committee; 1879–1881 | Succeeded by John Sherman |
| Preceded by Justin Morrill | Chair of the Senate Finance Committee; 1893–1895 | Succeeded by Justin Morrill |
