= William C.B. Sewell House =

Historic house in Indiana, United States

- William C. B. Sewell House
- U.S. National Register of Historic Places
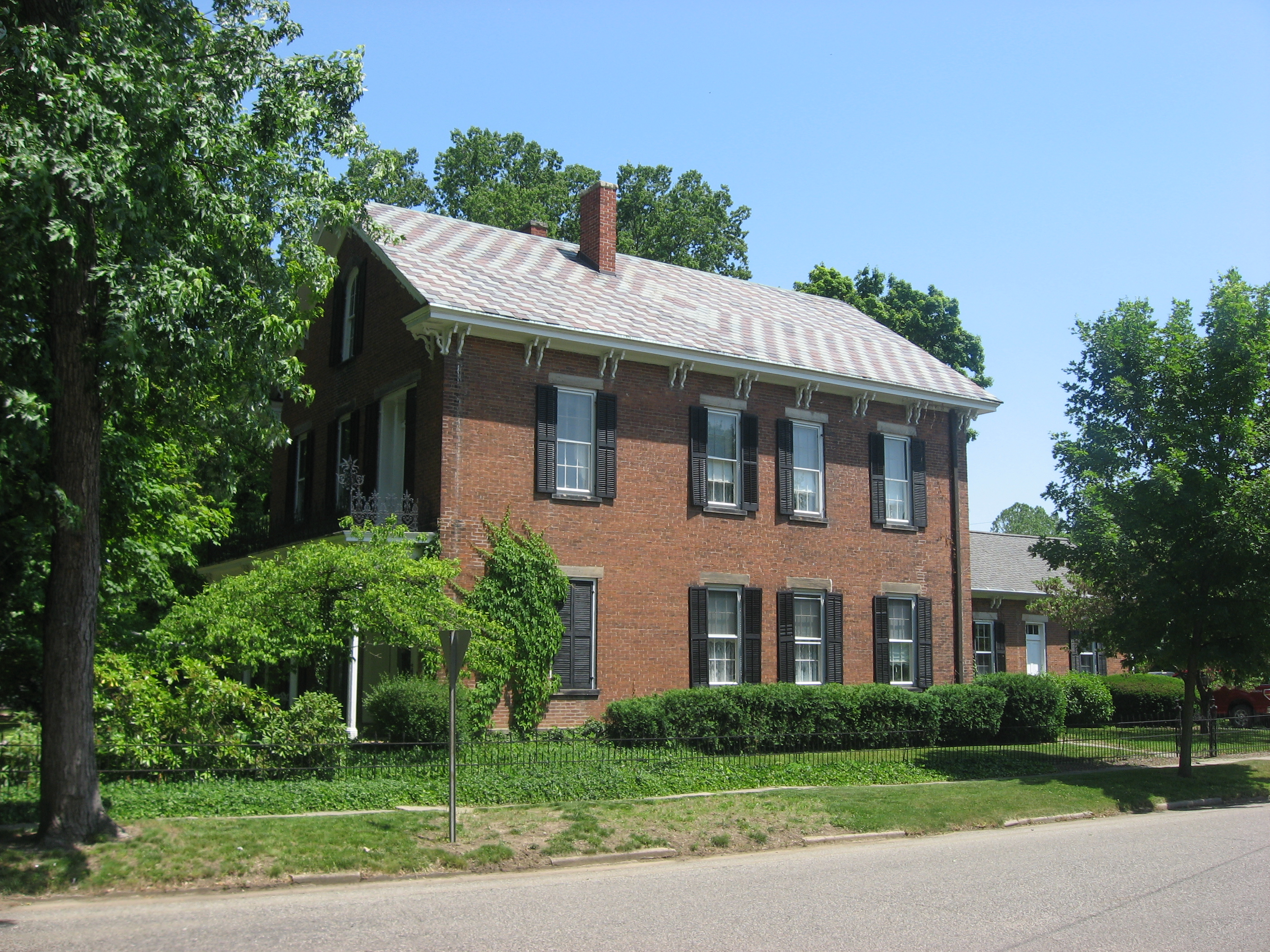
- William C.B. Sewell House, May 2012

- Location within Fountain County, Indiana Location within Indiana Location within the United States
- Location: 602 E. Washington St., Covington, Indiana
- Coordinates: 40°8′16″N 87°23′39″W
- Area: less than one acre
- Built: 1867
- Architectural style: Italianate
- NRHP reference No.: 84000027
- Added to NRHP: October 11, 1984

William C. B. Sewell House, is a historic home located at Covington, Indiana. It was built in 1867, and is a 2 1/2-story, three-bay, Italianate style brick dwelling. It has two wings and a separate summer kitchen. The front facade features a full-width, one-story decorative front porch and a pair of cast-iron lions.

It was listed on the National Register of Historic Places in 1984.
