= Fountain County Courthouse =

- U.S. National Register of Historic Places
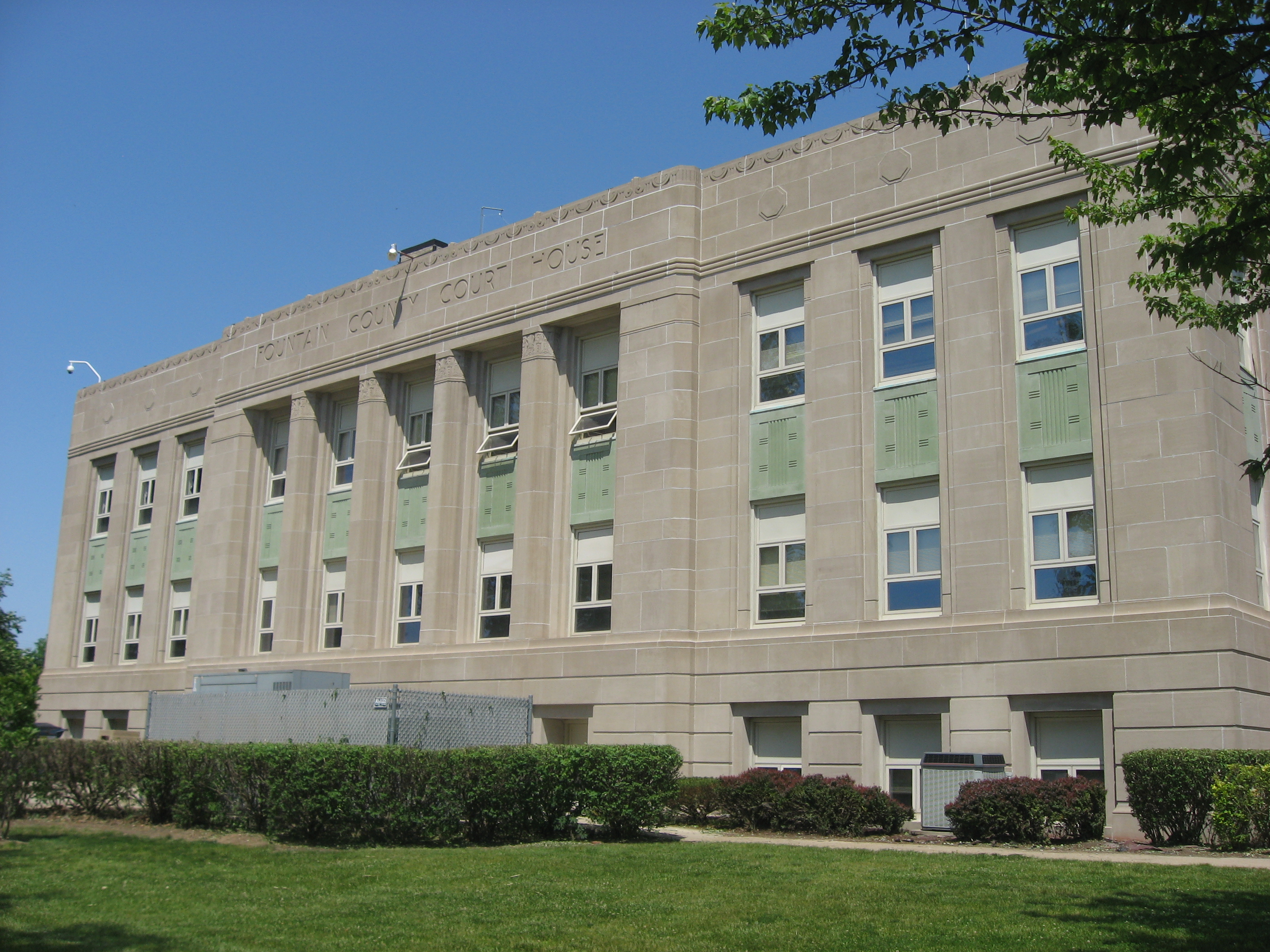
- Front, seen from the south

- Location within Fountain County, Indiana Location within Indiana Location within the United States
- Location: 301 4th St., Covington, Indiana
- Coordinates: 40°8′12″N 87°23′50″W
- Area: 1.6 acres (0.65 ha)
- Architect: Louis R. Johnson, et al.
- Architectural style: Art Deco
- NRHP reference No.: 08000191
- Added to NRHP: March 19, 2008

Fountain County Courthouse is a historic courthouse located at Covington, Indiana. It was built in 1937 as a Public Works Administration project.

== History ==
Fountain County Courthouse was designed by Louis Johnson, and completed in July 1937. The construction of the building cost $228,822. It is a three-story, Art Deco style, flat roofed building faced with Indiana limestone. It measures 116 feet by 89 feet and incorporates a 32 foot-square wired-glass skylight. It was built to replace three previous courthouses that were built in 1827, 1833, and 1859.

It was listed on the National Register of Historic Places in 2007.

== Interior ==
The interior features a collection of murals, totaling 2,500 square foot, painted by Eugene Savage. The murals reflect the history of Fountain County. In 1983, the murals underwent conservation, using sealant which caused the paint to begin to peel from the walls.
