= Carnegie Library of Covington =

- U.S. National Register of Historic Places
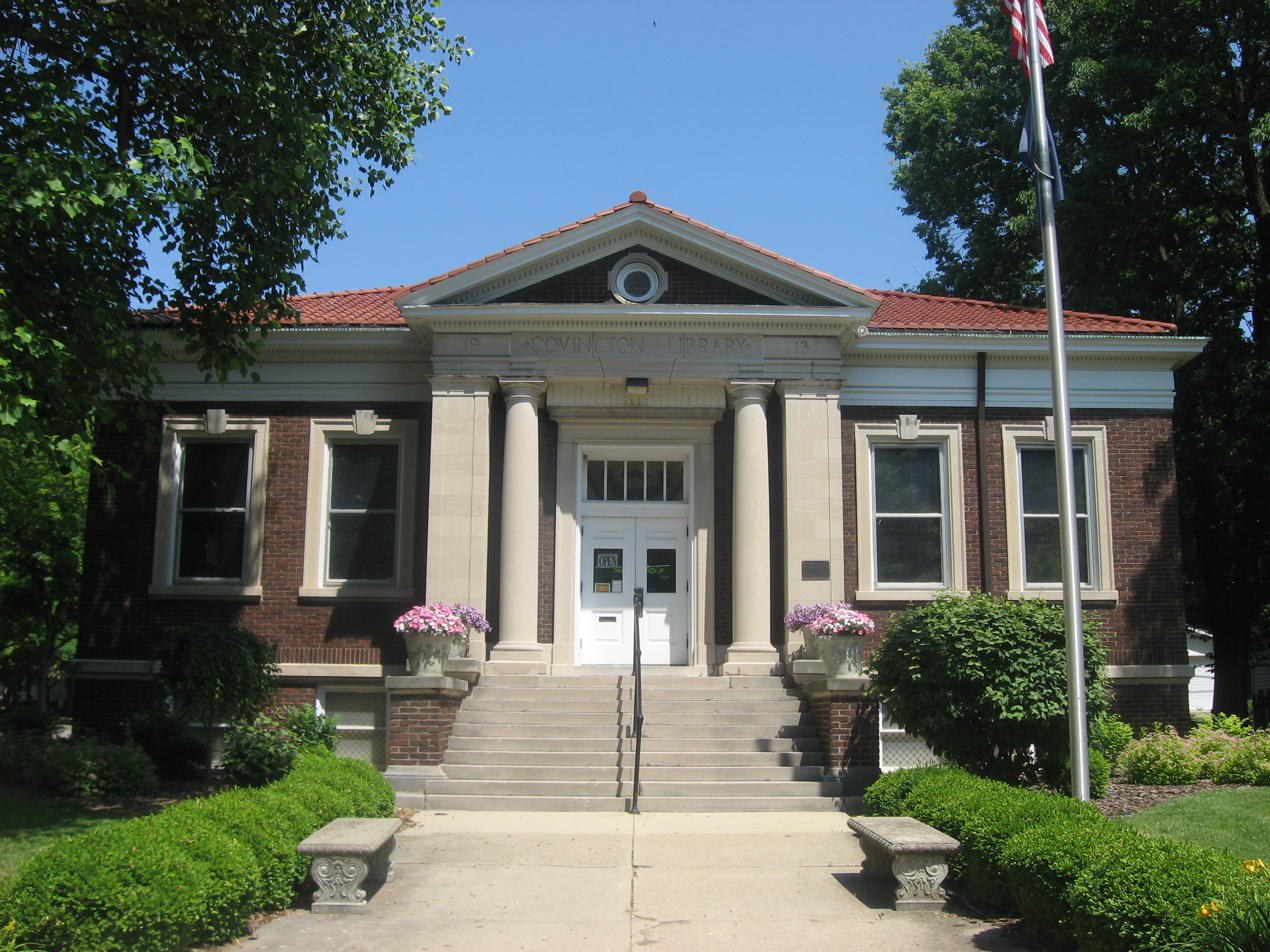

- Location within Fountain County, Indiana Location within Indiana Location within the United States
- Location: 622 S. Fifth St., Covington, Indiana
- Coordinates: 40°8′26″N 87°23′40″W
- Area: less than one acre
- Built: 1914
- Built by: Charles A. Brown
- Architect: Liese & Ludwig
- Architectural style: Classical Revival
- NRHP reference No.: 89000239
- Added to NRHP: April 3, 1989

The Carnegie Library of Covington, also known as Covington Public Library, is a historic Carnegie library located at the corner of Fifth and Crockett Streets (622 S. Fifth St.), Covington, Indiana. It was built in 1913–1914 by Charles A. Brown and is a one-story, rectangular brick building in the Neoclassical style. It has a low-pitched hipped roof, and the front facade features a one-story projecting pedimented portico. The building was renovated, and a new addition was added in 1995.

The Carnegie Corporation of New York awarded $10,000 to build the library in 1913. It is among 164 public libraries (and two academic libraries) that the Carnegie Corporation endowed in Indiana. It opened in 1914.

It was listed on the National Register of Historic Places in 1989.

The library remains in operation today as a branch of the Covington-Veedersburg Public Library.

== See also ==
- List of Carnegie libraries in Indiana
