= Attica, Indiana =

- City
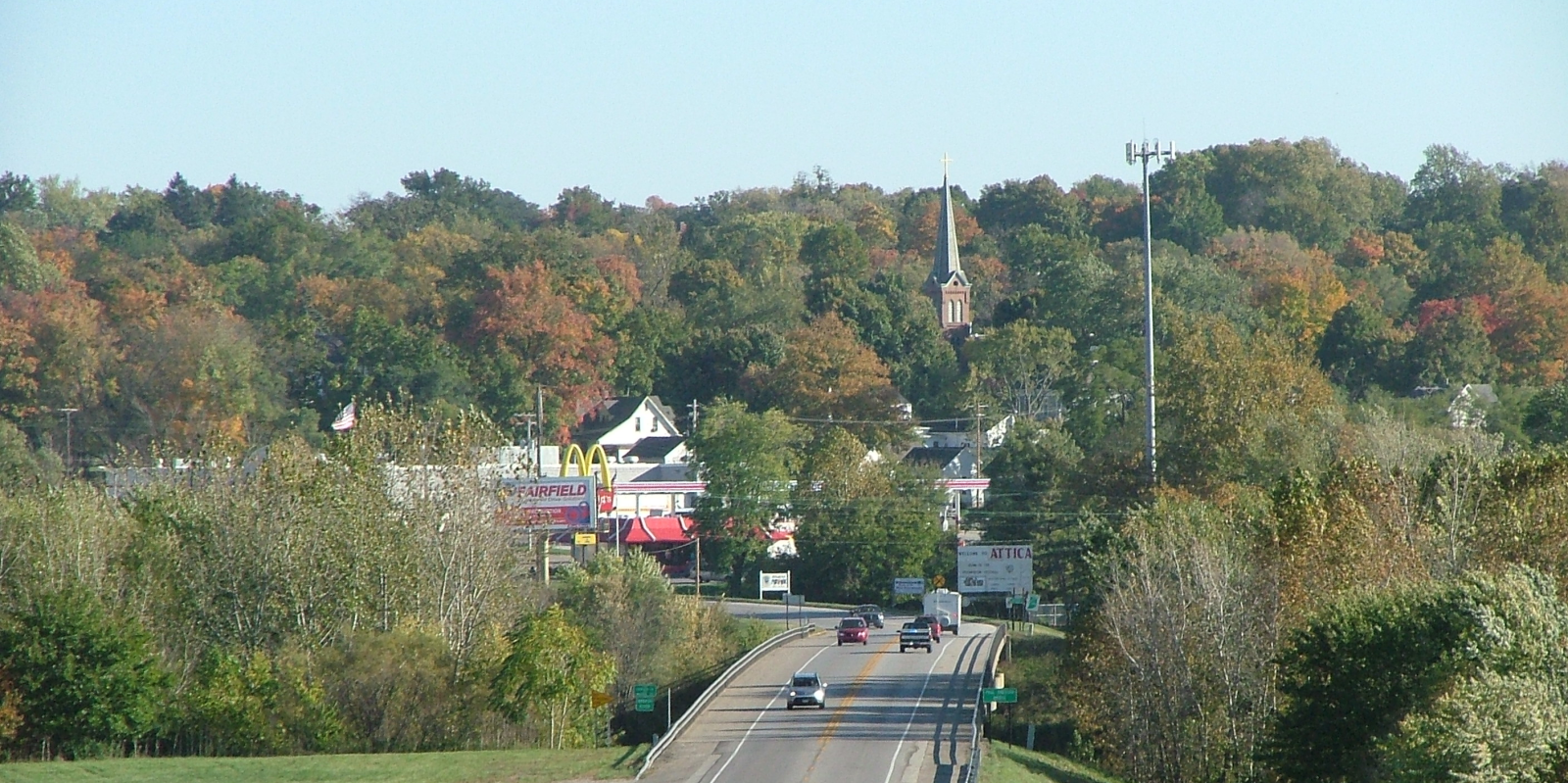
- Looking into Attica across the Wabash

- Logo
- Nickname: Johnson I.N
- Location of Attica in Fountain County, Indiana.

- Attica's location in Fountain County
- Coordinates: 40°17′08″N 87°15′00″W
- Country: United States
- State: Indiana
- County: Fountain
- Township: Logan
- Founded: 1825
- Incorporated: 1849

Government
  - Mayor: Larry Grant

Area
  - Total: 1.80 sq mi (4.67 km^{2})
  - Land: 1.80 sq mi (4.67 km^{2})
  - Water: 0 sq mi (0.00 km^{2})
- Elevation: 640 ft (200 m)

Population (2020)
  - Total: 3,036
  - Density: 1,683.1/sq mi (649.85/km^{2})
- Time zone: UTC-5 (EST)
  - Summer (DST): UTC-4 (EDT)
- ZIP code: 47918
- Area code: 765
- FIPS code: 18-02620
- GNIS ID: 2394018
- Website: attica-in.gov

Attica is a city in Logan Township, Fountain County, Indiana, United States. As of the 2020 census, Attica had a population of 3,036.

== History ==
Attica was laid out by George Hollingsworth and platted by David Stump in 1825. The completion of the Wabash and Erie Canal through the town in 1847 brought a considerable amount of growth to the area, and ended (in Attica's favor) a long-standing rivalry with the neighboring communities of Rob Roy, Williamsport and Covington.

In the summer of 1849, Attica was incorporated as a town.

Attica is the nearest town to the location where Paul Dresser is believed to have written the state song, "On the Banks of the Wabash, Far Away", in 1897, and the bridge over the Wabash River bears his name.

The growth of Attica led to its inclusion of neighboring unincorporated communities such as Vine, for which a post office has been established in 1895, and remained in operation until it was discontinued in 1900. According to one source, the name Vine had been chosen for its brevity. Modernly, the location is marked by the southern termination of North Vine School Road.

The Attica Downtown Historic District, Attica Main Street Historic District, Brady Street Historic District, Marshall M. Milford House, and Old East Historic District are listed on the National Register of Historic Places.

== Geography ==
Map of Attica

Attica is located along the Wabash River in Logan Township. U.S. Route 41, State Road 28, and State Road 55 intersect at Attica.

According to the 2010 census, Attica has a total area of 1.6 square miles (4.14 km^{2}), all land.

== Demographics ==
Historical population
Census	Pop.	Note	%±
1860	1,713		—
1870	2,273		32.7%
1880	2,150		−5.4%
1890	2,320		7.9%
1900	3,005		29.5%
1910	3,335		11.0%
1920	3,392		1.7%
1930	3,700		9.1%
1940	3,760		1.6%
1950	3,862		2.7%
1960	4,341		12.4%
1970	4,262		−1.8%
1980	3,841		−9.9%
1990	3,457		−10.0%
2000	3,491		1.0%
2010	3,245		−7.0%
2020	3,036		−6.4%
U.S. Decennial Census

=== 2020 census ===
As of the 2020 census, Attica had a population of 3,036. The median age was 40.8 years. 21.6% of residents were under the age of 18 and 19.7% of residents were 65 years of age or older. For every 100 females there were 101.7 males, and for every 100 females age 18 and over there were 97.4 males age 18 and over.

0.0% of residents lived in urban areas, while 100.0% lived in rural areas.

There were 1,292 households in Attica, of which 26.8% had children under the age of 18 living in them. Of all households, 41.6% were married-couple households, 22.1% were households with a male householder and no spouse or partner present, and 28.4% were households with a female householder and no spouse or partner present. About 32.5% of all households were made up of individuals and 16.4% had someone living alone who was 65 years of age or older.

There were 1,477 housing units, of which 12.5% were vacant. The homeowner vacancy rate was 5.2% and the rental vacancy rate was 9.3%.

Racial composition as of the 2020 census
Race	Number	Percent
White	2,809	92.5%
Black or African American	25	0.8%
American Indian and Alaska Native	8	0.3%
Asian	4	0.1%
Native Hawaiian and Other Pacific Islander	5	0.2%
Some other race	35	1.2%
Two or more races	150	4.9%
Hispanic or Latino (of any race)	82	2.7%

=== 2010 census ===
As of the 2010 United States census, there were 3,245 people, 1,308 households, and 843 families residing here. The population density was 2,028.3 inhabitants per square mile (783.1/km^{2}). There were 1,507 housing units at an average density of 942.0 per square mile (363.7/km^{2}). The racial makeup was 97.8% white, 0.3% Asian, 0.2% American Indian, 0.1% black or African American, 0.6% from other races, and 1.0% from two or more races. Those of Hispanic or Latino origin made up 2.4% of the population.

Of the 1,308 households, 32.0% had children under the age of 18 living with them, 47.2% were married couples living together, 12.4% had a female householder with no husband present, 35.6% were non-families, and 30.3% of all households were made up of individuals. The average household size was 2.45 and the average family size was 3.00. The median age was 38.9 years.

=== Demographic estimates ===
In terms of ancestry, 26.3% were German, 14.1% were English, 13.9% were Irish, and 12.3% were American.

=== Income and poverty ===
The median income for a household was $34,804 and the median income for a family was $52,669. Males had a median income of $45,682 versus $24,574 for females. The per capita income for was $21,287. About 13.3% of families and 16.3% of the population were below the poverty line, including 26.0% of those under age 18 and 13.9% of those age 65 or over.

== Education ==
The city has a free lending library, the Attica Public Library.

== Notable people ==
- Catherine Backus (1863–1955), sculptor
- George Dewey Hay, founder of the Grand Ole Opry
- Rena Elrod (1872–1950), Illinois representative from Chicago; born and raised in Attica
- Fred S. Purnell (1882–1939), U.S. representative from Indiana
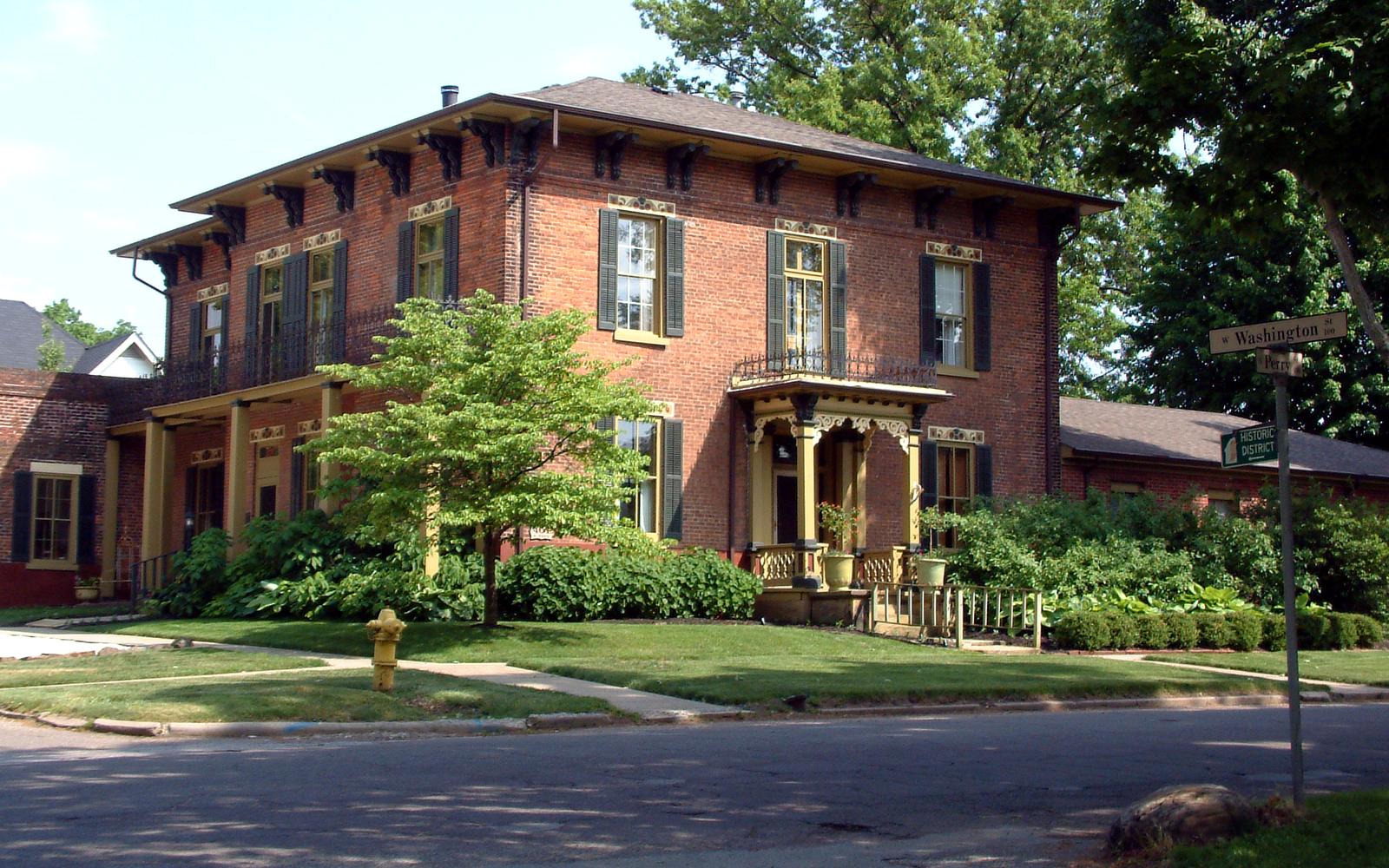
A home in the historic district.

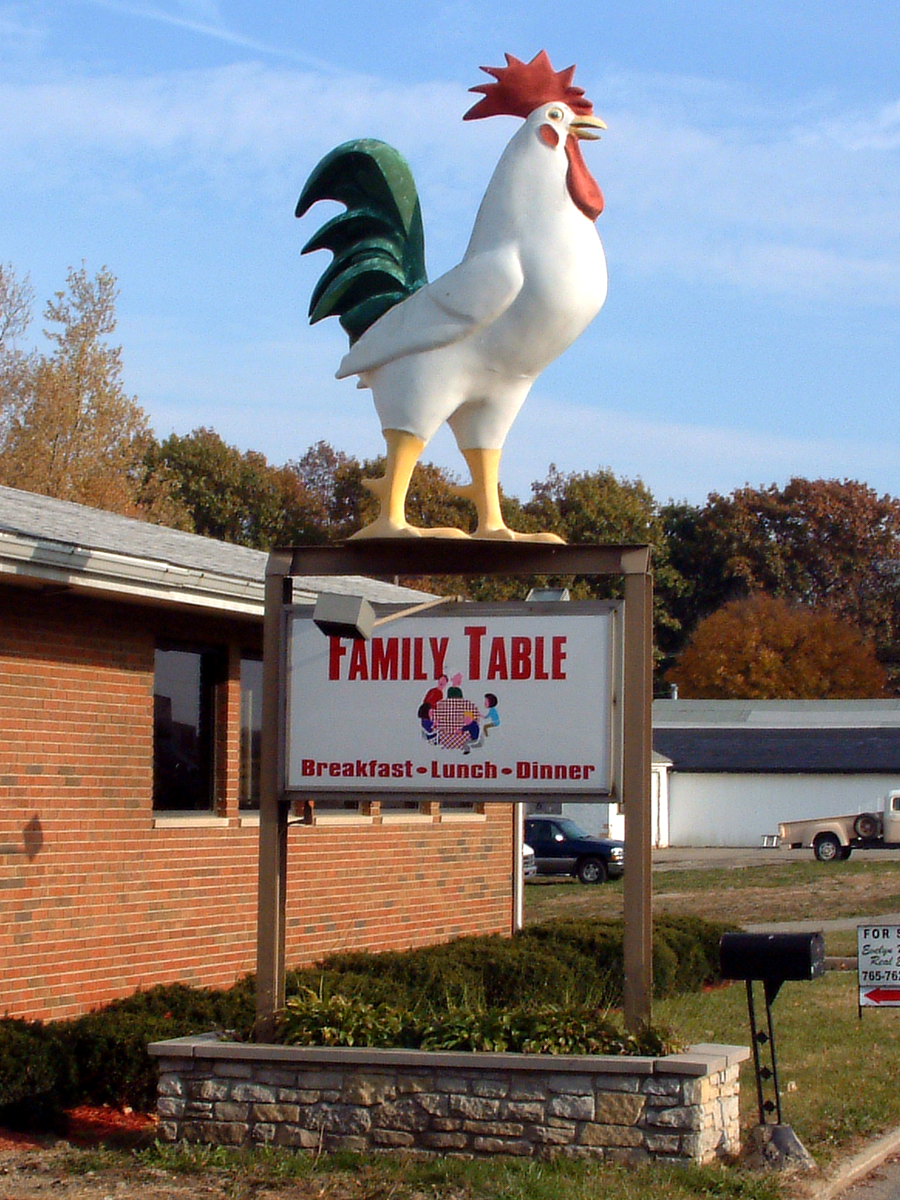
A restaurant on East Main Street.

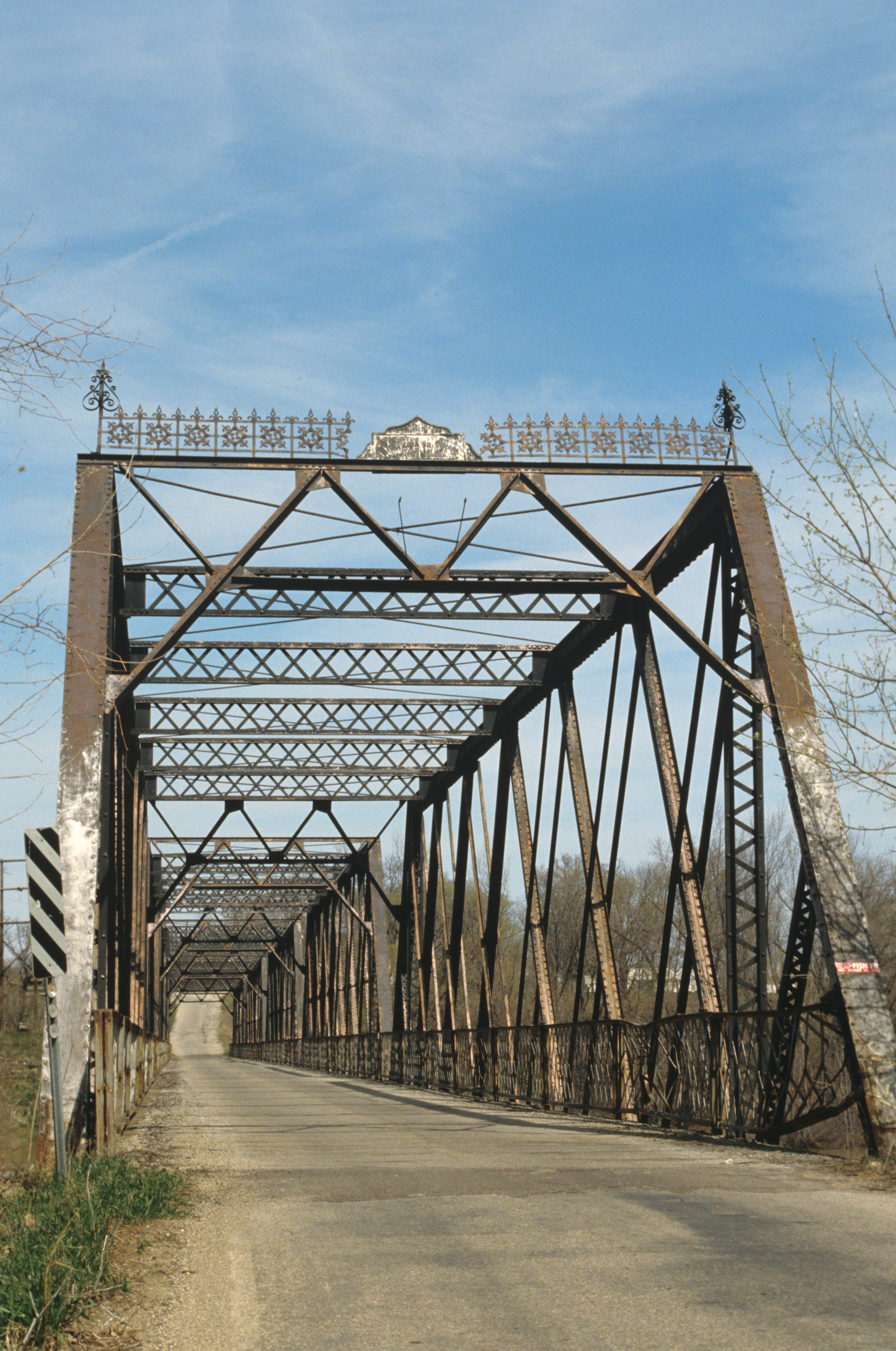
Independence Bridge over Wabash River
