= Covington, Indiana =

Covington
- City
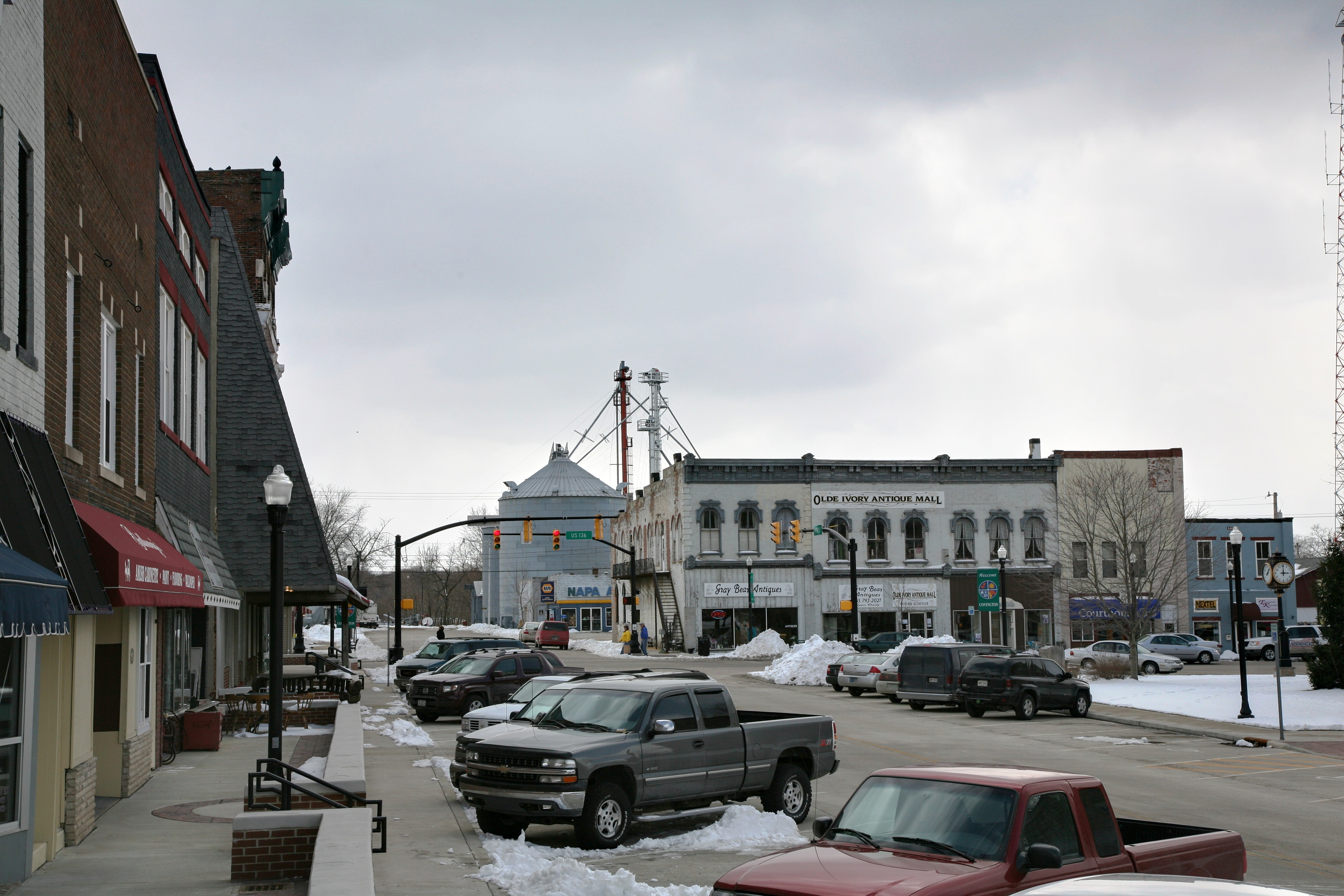
- Covington town square

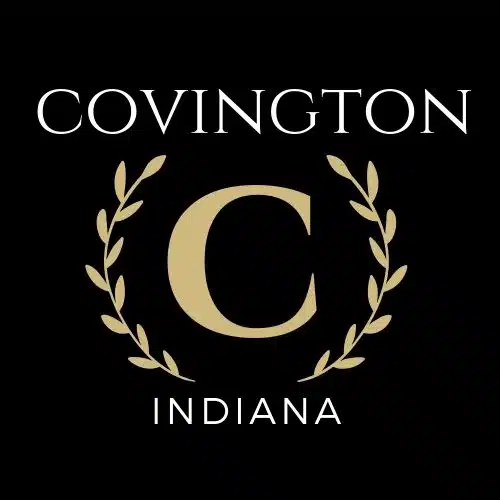
- Logo

- Location of Covington in Fountain County, Indiana.

- Covington's location in Fountain County
- Coordinates: 40°08′30″N 87°23′03″W
- Country: United States
- State: Indiana
- County: Fountain
- Township: Troy

Government
  - Mayor: Bradley D. Crain (R)

Area
  - Total: 1.29 sq mi (3.34 km^{2})
  - Land: 1.29 sq mi (3.34 km^{2})
  - Water: 0 sq mi (0.00 km^{2})
- Elevation: 571 ft (174 m)

Population (2020)
  - Total: 2,668
  - Density: 2,067.5/sq mi (798.26/km^{2})
- Time zone: UTC-5 (EST)
  - Summer (DST): UTC-4 (EDT)
- ZIP code: 47932
- Area code: 765
- FIPS code: 18-15490
- GNIS feature ID: 2393656
- Website: www.covingtonin.net

Covington is a city in, and the county seat of, Fountain County, Indiana, United States. The population was 2,668 at the 2020 census.

== History ==
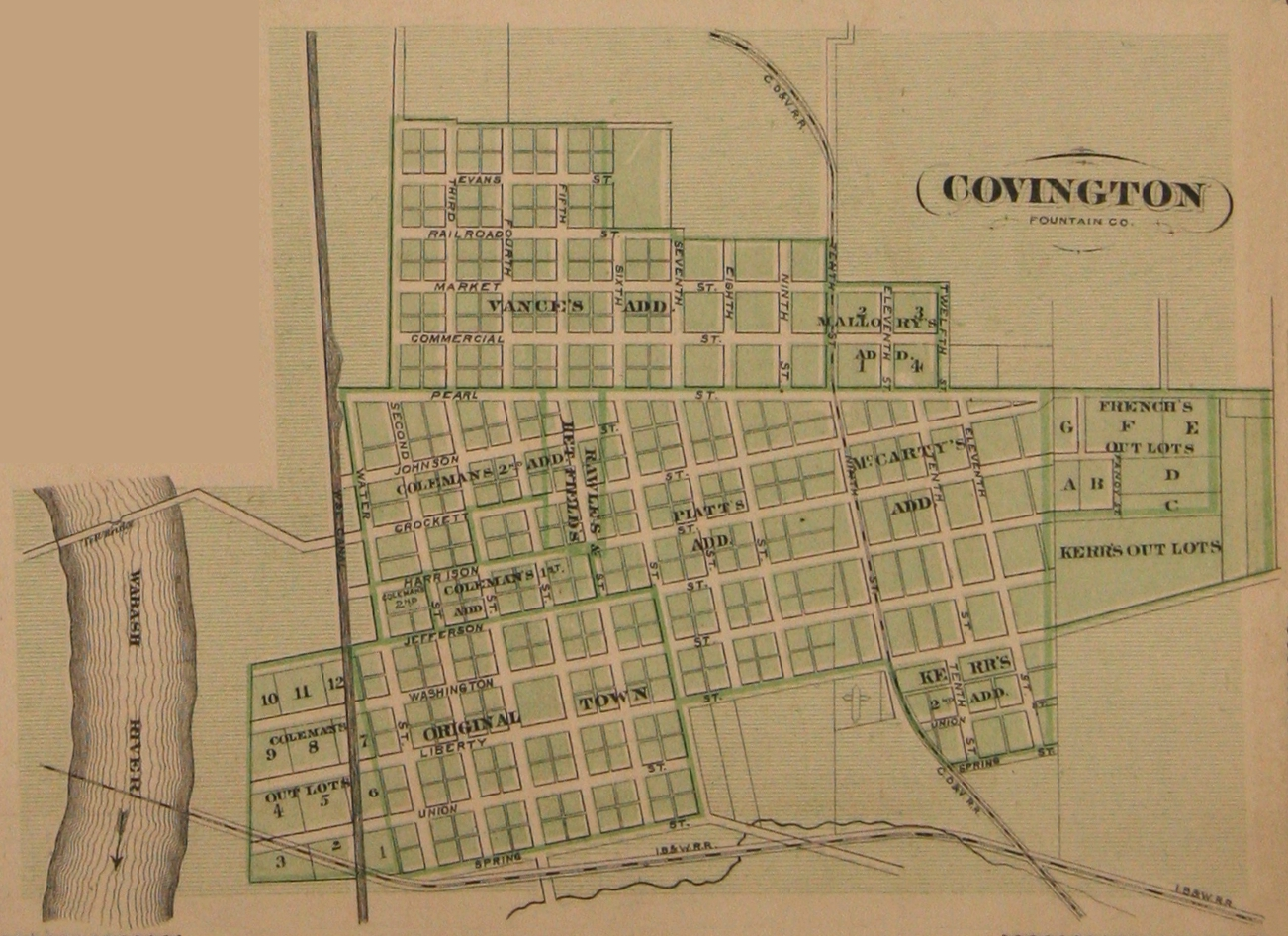
Map of Covington from 1876 atlas

Fountain County was formed on April 1, 1826. Later that year, the county seat was established at Covington, and a two-story frame courthouse was built in 1827. The location of the county seat was a point of contention for some years, as Covington was not centrally located in the county. In 1831 an act was passed that called for the relocation of the county seat, but after further discussion it was decided that it should remain where it was. Eventually the coming of the railroads helped to alleviate the geographical concern. A brick courthouse was completed in 1833.

The Carnegie Library of Covington, Covington Courthouse Square Historic District, Covington Residential Historic District, Fountain County Clerk's Building, Fountain County Courthouse, and William C.B. Sewell House are listed on the National Register of Historic Places.

== Geography ==
Map of Covington

Covington is located in the west part of Fountain County along the Wabash River, where U.S. Route 136 crosses the river. Interstate 74 passes about 0.5 miles (0.80 km) to the south of the city.

According to the 2010 census, Covington has a total area of 1.18 square miles (3.06 km^{2}), all land.

== Demographics ==
Historical population
Census	Pop.	Note	%±
1850	1,176		—
1860	1,366		16.2%
1870	1,888		38.2%
1880	1,920		1.7%
1890	1,891		−1.5%
1900	2,213		17.0%
1910	2,069		−6.5%
1920	1,945		−6.0%
1930	2,008		3.2%
1940	2,096		4.4%
1950	2,235		6.6%
1960	2,759		23.4%
1970	2,641		−4.3%
1980	2,883		9.2%
1990	2,747		−4.7%
2000	2,565		−6.6%
2010	2,645		3.1%
2020	2,668		0.9%
U.S. Decennial Census

=== 2020 census ===
As of the 2020 census, Covington had a population of 2,668. The median age was 46.0 years. 21.4% of residents were under the age of 18 and 26.6% of residents were 65 years of age or older. For every 100 females there were 89.4 males, and for every 100 females age 18 and over there were 84.1 males age 18 and over.

0.0% of residents lived in urban areas, while 100.0% lived in rural areas.

There were 1,153 households in Covington, of which 25.8% had children under the age of 18 living in them. Of all households, 43.1% were married-couple households, 17.3% were households with a male householder and no spouse or partner present, and 33.3% were households with a female householder and no spouse or partner present. About 35.5% of all households were made up of individuals and 18.2% had someone living alone who was 65 years of age or older.

There were 1,227 housing units, of which 6.0% were vacant. The homeowner vacancy rate was 2.3% and the rental vacancy rate was 5.5%.

Racial composition as of the 2020 census
Race	Number	Percent
White	2,523	94.6%
Black or African American	16	0.6%
American Indian and Alaska Native	3	0.1%
Asian	18	0.7%
Native Hawaiian and Other Pacific Islander	1	0.0%
Some other race	9	0.3%
Two or more races	98	3.7%
Hispanic or Latino (of any race)	59	2.2%

=== 2010 census ===
As of the 2010 United States census, there were 2,645 people, 1,120 households, and 712 families residing here. The population density was 2,249 inhabitants per square mile (868/km^{2}). There were 1,197 housing units at an average density of 1,018 per square mile (393/km^{2}). The racial makeup was 97.6% white, 0.5% American Indian, 0.3% Asian, 0.2% black or African American, 0.4% from other races, and 1.1% from two or more races. Those of Hispanic or Latino origin made up 1.1% of the population. In terms of ancestry, 23.0% were German, 13.6% were Irish, 13.4% were American, and 12.9% were English.

Of the 1,120 households, 28.5% had children under the age of 18 living with them, 48.8% were married couples living together, 11.3% had a female householder with no husband present, 36.4% were non-families, and 32.8% of all households were made up of individuals. The average household size was 2.25 and the average family size was 2.83. The median age was 44.0 years.

=== Income and poverty ===
The median income for a household was $47,545 and the median income for a family was $60,913. Males had a median income of $41,354 versus $33,551 for females. The per capita income for was $24,694. About 4.0% of families and 6.7% of the population were below the poverty line, including 12.1% of those under age 18 and 7.3% of those age 65 or over.

== Education ==
The Covington Community School Corporation consists of one elementary school, one middle school, and one high school (Covington Community High School), all located within Covington.

The town has a public library, a branch of the Covington-Veedersburg Public Library.

== Contemporary life ==
The Covington Business Association sponsors the town's Apple Festival, which happens each autumn around the town square.

The City of Covington maintains a park and trail system.

== Transportation ==
Interstate 74 passes by the south edge of Covington, traveling east toward Indianapolis, Indiana, and west toward Champaign, Illinois. U.S. Route 136 passes through the middle of town, traveling west toward Danville, Illinois, and east toward Veedersburg.

== Notable people ==
- Jim Baird (politician), U.S. Representative for Indiana's 4th congressional district, serving since 2019
- Dale Grubb, former member of the Indiana House of Representatives
- Cecil M. Harden, United States Representative
- Caroline Henderson Griffiths, philanthropist
- John T. Myers, United States Representative
- Eugene Savage, painter and sculptor
- Wilber Moore Stilwell, painter
- Charles Stewart Voorhees (1853–1909) lawyer and two-term Delegate to U.S. Congress from the Territory of Washington.
- Lew Wallace, Union Army general and author of Ben Hur
- Susan Wallace, author and poet; wife of Lew Wallace
