= Wabash =

Wabash may refer to:

== Political entities ==
- Wabash Confederacy, or Wabash Indians, a loose confederacy of 18th century Native Americans

== Places in the United States ==
- Wabash River, in Ohio, Indiana and Illinois
- Wabash Valley, in Illinois and Indiana
- Wabash, Arkansas, an unincorporated community
- Wabash, Indiana, a city
- Wabash County, Illinois
  - Wabash Precinct, Wabash County, Illinois
- Wabash County, Indiana
- Wabash, Nebraska, an unincorporated community
- Wabash, Ohio, an unincorporated community
- Wabash, King County, Washington, an unincorporated community
- Wabash, Lewis County, Washington, an unincorporated community
- Wabash, West Virginia, a ghost town
- Wabash township (disambiguation)
- Wabash Formation, a geologic formation in Indiana

== Schools ==
- Wabash College, a college in Crawfordsville, Indiana
- Wabash Valley College, a college in Mount Carmel, Illinois
- Wabash High School, Wabash, Indiana

== In transportation ==
- Wabash Railroad, a former railroad that operated in the Midwestern United States
  - Wabash, St. Louis & Pacific Railway Company v. Illinois, an 1886 U.S. Supreme Court case
- Wabash Avenue (disambiguation)
- Wabash Bridge (disambiguation)
- Wabash Combination Depot-Moravia, Moravia, Iowa, a historic train station on the National Register of Historic Places
- Wabash Railroad Station and Freight House, Columbia, Missouri, on the National Register of Historic Places
- Wabash Tunnel, a former railway tunnel, and current automobile tunnel
- Wabash National, a manufacturer of trailers and transportation equipment

== Other uses ==
- Battle of the Wabash (disambiguation), several battles
- USS Wabash, multiple ships
- Wabash Trail (disambiguation)
- 2453 Wabash, an asteroid
