= Armiesburg, Indiana =

Unincorporated community in Indiana, United States

- Unincorporated community
- Parke County's location in Indiana

- Location in Parke County
- Coordinates: 39°45′48″N 87°21′04″W
- Country: United States
- State: Indiana
- County: Parke
- Township: Wabash
- Elevation: 520 ft (160 m)
- Time zone: UTC-5 (Eastern (EST))
  - Summer (DST): UTC-4 (EDT)
- ZIP code: 47862
- Area code: 765
- GNIS feature ID: 449613

Armiesburg (also called Armiesburg Mills, Armiesburgh or Stringtown) is an unincorporated community in Wabash Township, Parke County, in Indiana.

== History ==
When General William Henry Harrison took an army from Vincennes to the Battle of Tippecanoe in late 1811, Zachariah Cicott served as a scout. Cicott was familiar with the area because of his time levitating up and down the Wabash River, starting circa 1801. The trail taken by Harrison's army passed through the area that later became Parke County on its way to and from the battle site in Tippecanoe County. The settlement of Armiesburg was so named because Harrison and his army crossed the Raccoon Creek and camped near there on their way to the battle. After the county was established in 1821, the county seat was located first at Roseville, and second at Armiesburg where at least two court sessions were held. The county seat was finally located at Rockville in 1822. The original plat of the town was destroyed along with many other records in an 1832 fire in Rockville; the town was platted again in 1833.

A post office was established at Armiesburg in 1844, and remained in operation until it was discontinued in 1902.

== Geography ==
Armiesburg is located in the western part of the county, just over 1 mile (1.6 km) to the east of the confluence of the Big Raccoon Creek and the Wabash River, and about 1.5 miles (2.4 km) southeast of Montezuma. Its elevation is 525 feet (160 m).

== See also ==
Armiesburg Covered Bridge
