= Wabash Township, Indiana =

Wabash Township, Indiana may refer to one of the following places:

- Wabash Township, Adams County, Indiana
- Wabash Township, Fountain County, Indiana
- Wabash Township, Gibson County, Indiana
- Wabash Township, Jay County, Indiana
- Wabash Township, Parke County, Indiana
- Wabash Township, Tippecanoe County, Indiana

See also

- Wabash Township (disambiguation)
