= USS Seneca =

USS Seneca has been the name of more than one United States Navy ship, and may refer to:

- USS Seneca (1861), a gunboat in commission from 1861 to 1865
- USS Seneca (SP-427), a minesweeper and patrol vessel in commission from 1917 to 1919
- USS Seneca (SP-1240), a barge in commission from 1917 to 1919
- USS Seneca (SP-1824), the originally planned name and designation of a cargo ship commissioned as USS Wabash and in commission from 1918 to 1919
- USS Seneca (AT-91), a tug in commission from 1943 to 1971
