= USS Wabash (ID-1824) =

German-built cargo steamship

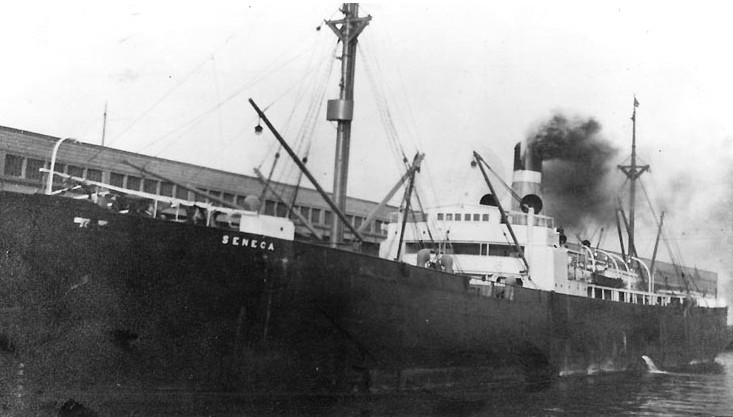
- The ship as Seneca

History
- Name: 1900: Wartburg; 1905: Tübingen; 1917: Seneca; 1918: Wabash
- Namesake: 1900: Wartburg; 1905: Tübingen; 1917: Seneca people; 1918: Wabash River
- Owner: 1900: DDG „Hansa“; 1905: Norddeutscher Lloyd; 1917: US Shipping Board; 1921: N Atlantic & W SS Co
- Operator: 1918: United States Navy
- Port of registry: 1900: (German Empire) Bremen; 1919: (United States) San Francisco; 1921: (United States) New York; 1922: (United States) Wilmington
- Builder: Wigham Richardson, Low Walker
- Yard number: 365
- Launched: 11 September 1900
- Completed: October 1900
- Commissioned: 9 February 1918
- Decommissioned: 21 April 1919
- Identification: 1900: code letters QHDF; 1918: US official number 215554; 1918: Naval Registry ID-1824; 1919: code letters LHTD
- Fate: Scrapped, 1924

General characteristics
- Type: cargo ship
- Tonnage: 5,448 GRT, 3,516 NRT
- Displacement: 10,475 tons
- Length: 381.0 ft (116.1 m)
- Beam: 49.9 ft (15.2 m)
- Depth: 26.6 ft (8.1 m)
- Decks: 2
- Installed power: 460 NHP; 2,500 ihp
- Propulsion: 1 × quadruple-expansion engine; 1 × screw
- Speed: 13.5 knots (25 km/h) maximum; 11.4 knots (21 km/h) cruising
- Complement: in US Navy: 93
- Sensors & processing systems: by 1911: submarine signalling
- Armament: 1918: 1 × 5-inch/40-caliber gun; 1 × 3-inch/23-caliber gun
- Notes: sister ship: Löwenburg

USS Wabash (ID-1824) was a cargo steamship. She was launched in Germany in 1900 for DDG „Hansa“ as Wartburg. In 1905 Norddeutscher Lloyd (NDL) bought her and renamed her Tübingen. In 1917 the United States seized her and renamed her Seneca. In 1918 she was commissioned into the United States Navy as USS Wabash. She was scrapped in Italy in 1924.

She was the second of three DDG „Hansa“ ships to be named after Wartburg castle in Thuringia. The first was launched in 1888; sold and renamed in 1900; and abandoned in 1903. The third was launched in 1905; surrendered to the Allies and renamed in 1919; and scrapped in 1932.

She was the first of two NDL ships to be called Tübingen. The second was built in 1929 from the salvaged part of a British ship called Delaware; sold in 1935; and sunk in 1945.

She was one of several ships to be called Seneca, and the second of four ships to be called USS Wabash.

== Building ==
In the fall of 1900, DDG „Hansa“ took delivery of a pair of new cargo ships. They were built by different shipyards in different countries, but they were sister ships. Flensburger Schiffbau-Gesellschaft in Flensburg, Germany launched Löwenburg on 8 July and completed her that September. Wigham Richardson and Company in Low Walker, England launched Wartburg on 11 September and completed her that October.

Wartburg's registered length was 381.0 ft (116.1 m), her beam was 49.9 ft (15.2 m), and her depth was 26.6 ft (8.1 m). Her tonnages were 5,448 GRT, 3,516 NRT, and 10,475 tons displacement. She had a single screw, driven by a quadruple-expansion engine that was rated at 460 NHP or 2,500 ihp. She could cruise at 11.4 knots (21 km/h), and on her sea trials she achieved 13.5 knots (25 km/h).

== Wartburg and Tübingen ==
DDG „Hansa“ registered Wartburg in Bremen. Her code letters were QHDF. In October 1905 NDL bought her and renamed her Tübingen. That December, NDL also bought Löwenburg and renamed her Sigmaringen. By 1911 Tübingen was equipped with submarine signalling.

By December 1908, Tübingen was trading with ports in Australia. In January 1909 she loaded bagged wheat in Melbourne and then baled wool in Brisbane. In Brisbane on 27 January, fire broke out among wool stowed in the lower part of her No. 1 hold. Four fire engines from two Brisbane fire stations fought the fire, but it spread to the cargo in the upper part of the hold, so the hold was then deliberately flooded. The weather had been hot for several days, and the fire was attributed to spontaneous combustion. All of the cargo in her No. 1 hold was damaged, but the damage was not serious enough to prevent Tübingen from leaving on 30 January, bound for Antwerp.

She called at Sydney, and then at Adelaide. She left Adelaide on 12 February, assisted by a tug, Eagle. While she was in the Port River a tow line parted, leaving Tübingen adrift. Tübingen's crew dropped her anchors, which helped to check her drift, but her bow struck the quarter of the Adelaide Steamship Company ship Flinders, which was moored at Flinders Wharf. Two hull plates were dented, but Tübingen was able to get clear. A little later Tübingen ran aground, but without damage, and Eagle helped her to get clear and resume her voyage.

== Seizure by the US ==
On the eve of the First World War, the German Government ordered all German merchant ships to take refuge in the nearest German or neutral port. Tübingen sheltered in Manila. By 1917 she was one of 17 German merchant ships in Manila. On 3 February that year the US Government detained German ships in all ports of the US and its colonies.

On 6 April 1917 the USA declared war on Germany, and the US Government seized all the German ships that had been detained since February. The United States Shipping Board (USSB) assumed ownership of Tübingen. In September 1917 it was reported that the Pacific Mail Steamship Company had chartered three of the German ships seized in Manila: NDL's Coblenz, Princess Alice; and Tübingen.

== Seneca and Wabash ==
The USSB renamed Tübingen as Seneca. Her US official number was 215554. By February 1918 she was at Hoboken, New Jersey. On 9 February 1918 the US Navy acquired her at Hoboken, and on 16 February she was commissioned as USS Wabash, with the Naval Registry Identification Number ID-1824. Her commanding officer was Lt Cdr Frank Seeley, USNRF. She was defensively armed with one 5-inch/40-caliber gun and one 3-inch/23-caliber gun.

Wabash loaded construction iron and ammunition, and left the US on 28 February. She discharged her cargo at Pauillac in France, and returned to the US on 22 April. She then made four round trips between the US and Saint-Nazaire.

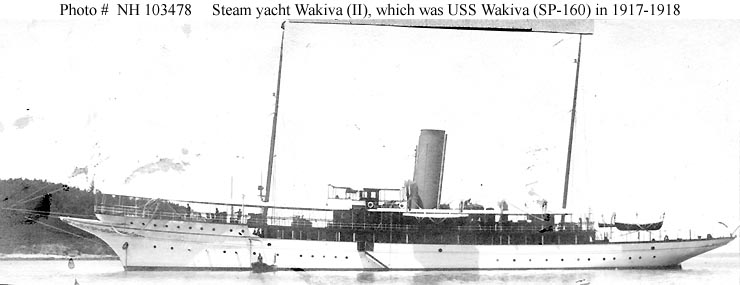
USS Wakiva II

On the first of these trips she was in a convoy of eight ships, escorted by the armed yacht USS Wakiva II. The convoy was zig-zagging as a precaution against U-boat attack, but on the night of 21–22 May visibility deteriorated in bad weather, so zig-zagging. Wabash used her steam whistle to indicate her position, but shortly after 03:10 hrs she accidentally rammed Wakiva II's starboard quarter. The yacht was holed below the waterline, and Wabash's starboard lifeboats were carried away. Two members of Wakiva II's crew were killed. Wakiva II launched her lifeboats; and Wabash launched her remaining undamaged boats. Wabash rescued survivors from the yacht, which sank at 03:30 hrs.

On 6 April 1919 Wabash reached New York at the end of the last of her naval voyages. On 21 April the Navy decommissioned her and returned her to the USSB.

By 1919 Wabash was registered in San Francisco, her code letters were LHTD, and she was equipped with wireless telegraphy. In 1919 she was to have been renamed Celeste Frankel, but this was cancelled. French-American Line bought her in 1920, and seem to have registered her in New York. In 1921 the North Atlantic and Western Steam Ship Co bought her, and registered her in Wilmington, Delaware. In 1924 a BWW Newhall bought her. Lloyd's Register recorded that she was registered in Belgium, but did not specify which port. In July 1924 Italian shipbreakers bought her for scrap. She was broken up in Genoa.

== Bibliography ==
- Gray, Leonard (1967). Deutsche Dampfschifffahrts-Gesellschaft "Hansa"; 85 Years of Shipping Under the Maltese Cross. Kendal: World Ship Society.
- Lloyd's Register of British and Foreign Shipping. Vol. I.–Steamers. London: Lloyd's Register of Shipping. 1901 – via Internet Archive.
- Lloyd's Register of British and Foreign Shipping. Vol. I.–Steamers. London: Lloyd's Register of Shipping. 1906 – via Internet Archive.
- Lloyd's Register of British and Foreign Shipping. Vol. I.–Steamers. London: Lloyd's Register of Shipping. 1911 – via Internet Archive.
- Lloyd's Register of Shipping. Vol. II.–Steamers. London: Lloyd's Register of Shipping. 1919 – via Internet Archive.
- Lloyd's Register of Shipping. Vol. II.–Steamers. London: Lloyd's Register of Shipping. 1921 – via Internet Archive.
- Lloyd's Register of Shipping. Vol. II.–Steamers and Motor Vessels. London: Lloyd's Register of Shipping. 1922 – via Internet Archive.
- Lloyd's Register of Shipping. Vol. II.–Steamers and Motorships. London: Lloyd's Register of Shipping. 1924 – via Internet Archive.
- United States Department of Commerce (1918). Fiftieth Annual List of Merchant Vessels of the United States. Washington, DC: Government Printing Office – via HathiTrust.
