= Wabash River =

River in Midwestern United States

Coordinates: 37°47′53″N 88°1′38″W

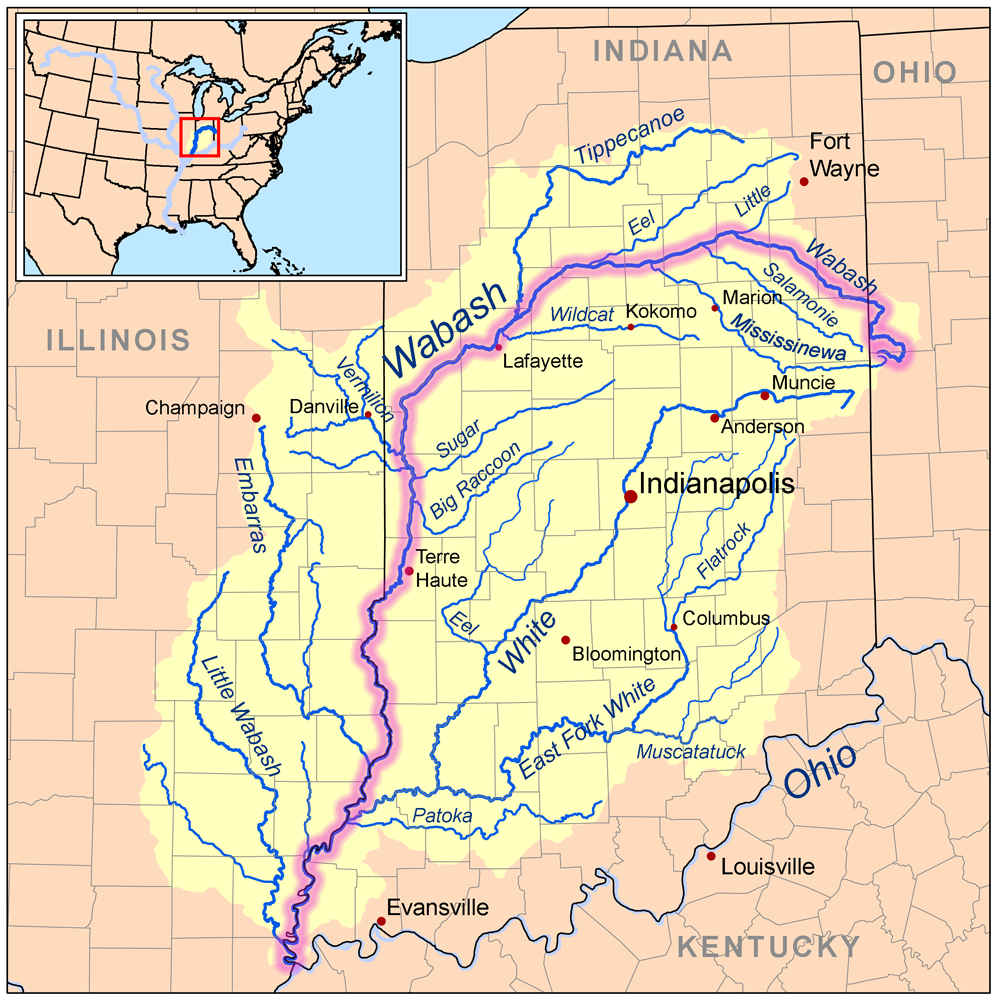
- Wabash River catchment with the Wabash River highlighted
- Native name: Waapaahšiki Siipiiwi (Miami-Illinois)

Location
- Country: US
- States: Ohio; Indiana; Illinois

Physical characteristics
- Source
  - location: Near Fort Recovery in Mercer County, Ohio
- Mouth
  - location: Ohio River near Shawneetown, Illinois
- Length: 503 mi (810 km)
- Basin size: 33,100 mi^{2} (86,000 km^{2})
- Discharge
  - average: 35,350 cu ft/s (1,001 m^{3}/s) for mouth

Basin features
- Progression: Wabash River → Ohio → Mississippi → Gulf of Mexico
- Tributaries
  - left: Salamonie River, Mississinewa River, Wildcat Creek, Sugar Creek, Big Raccoon Creek, White River, Patoka River
  - right: Little River, Eel River, Tippecanoe River, Vermilion River, Little Vermilion River, Embarras River, Little Wabash River

The Wabash River /ˈwɔːbæʃ/ WAW-bash (French: Ouabache [wabaʃ]) is a 503-mile-long (810 km) river that drains most of the state of Indiana, and a significant part of Illinois, in the United States. It flows from the headwaters in Ohio, near the Indiana border, then southwest across northern Indiana turning south near the Illinois border, where the southern portion forms the Indiana-Illinois border before flowing into the Ohio River.

It is the largest northern tributary of the Ohio River and third largest overall, behind the Cumberland and Tennessee rivers. From the dam near Huntington, Indiana, to its terminus at the Ohio River, the Wabash flows freely for 411 miles (661 km) The Tippecanoe River, White River, Embarras River and Little Wabash River are major tributaries. The river's name comes from a Miami word meaning "water over white stones", as its bottom is white limestone, obscured by sediment.

The Wabash is the state river of Indiana, and subject of the state song "On the Banks of the Wabash, Far Away" by Paul Dresser. Two counties (in Indiana and Illinois); eight townships in Illinois, Indiana, and Ohio; one Illinois precinct, one Indiana city, one Ohio town, two colleges, one high school, one canal, one former class I railroad, several bridges, and several avenues are named for the river while four US Navy warships are either named for the river or the numerous battles which took place on or near it.

== Etymology ==
The name Wabash is an English transliteration spelling of the French name for the river, Ouabache. French traders had adopted the Miami–Illinois word for the river, waapaahšiiki, meaning 'it shines white', 'pure white', or 'water over white stones', and attempted to spell it according to their own phonetic system. The Miami name expressed the clarity of the river in Huntington County, Indiana, where the river bottom is limestone.

== Geology ==
As the Laurentide Ice Sheet began to retreat from present-day Northern Indiana and Northwest Ohio between 14,000 and 15,000 years ago, it receded into three distinct lobes. The eastern or Erie Lobe sat atop and behind the Fort Wayne Moraine. Meltwater from the glacier fed into two ice-marginal streams, which became the St. Joseph and St. Marys rivers. Their combined discharge was probably the primary source of water for the proglacial Wabash River system.

As the Erie Lobe of the glacier continued to retreat, its meltwater was temporarily trapped between the ice front to the east and the Fort Wayne Moraine to the west, and formed proglacial Lake Maumee, the ancestor of modern Lake Erie. Around 11,000 years ago the waters of Lake Maumee became deep enough that it breached a "sag" or weak spot in the Fort Wayne Moraine. This caused a catastrophic draining of the lake, which in turn scoured a 1 to 2 mi (1.6 to 3.2 km) wide valley known as the Wabash-Erie Channel or "sluiceway". The Little (Wabash) River flows through this channel. U.S. 24 traverses it between Fort Wayne and Huntington. The valley is the largest topographical feature in Allen County, Indiana.

When the ice melted completely from the region, new outlets for Lake Maumee's water opened up at elevations lower than the Wabash-Erie Channel. While the St. Joseph and St. Marys Rivers continued to flow through the channel, Lake Maumee no longer did. Now a low-lying, probably marshy bit of terrain lay in between.

It is not known for certain when, but at some point in the distant past the St. Joseph and St. Marys Rivers jumped their banks and flooded the marshy ground of the Fort Wayne Outlet. The discharge of this unusual flood was enough to cut across the outlet and come into contact with the headwaters of the Maumee River. Once this happened, the flood waters rushed to the east into the Maumee River, and their erosive force was enough that the new channel cut across the Fort Wayne Outlet into the Maumee River since it was at a lower elevation than that of the sluiceway. This meant that when the flood waters receded, the sluiceway was permanently abandoned by the two rivers. As a result of capturing them both, the Maumee was converted from a minor creek to a large river. Once again, river waters flowed through the Fort Wayne Outlet, but now they flowed eastward, toward Lake Erie, instead of westward. Following this event, the branch of the Wabash River that originates along the Wabash Moraine near Bluffton became the system's main course and source.

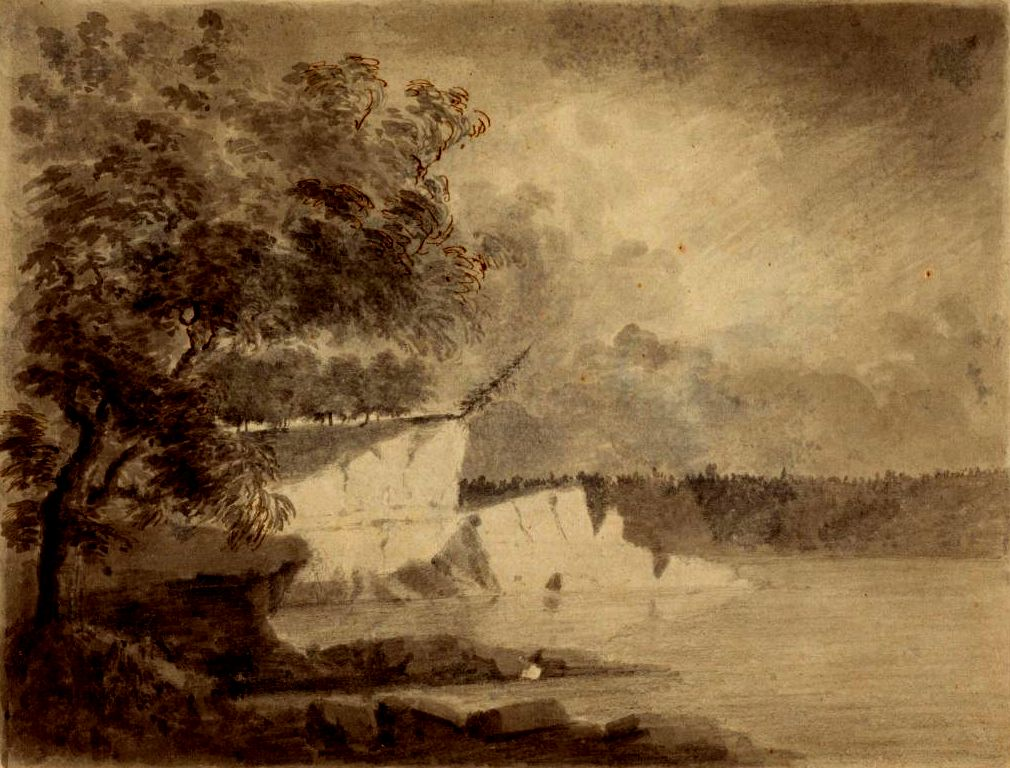
A scene along the Wabash River, sketched in 1778 by Lt Governor Henry Hamilton en route to recapture Vincennes, Indiana during the American Revolutionary War

For part of its course, the Wabash follows the path of the pre-glacial Teays River. The river has shifted course several times along the Indiana and Illinois border, creating cutoffs where parts of the river are entirely in either Indiana or Illinois. However, both states generally regard the middle of the river as the state border.

== History ==
The Wabash was first mapped by French explorers to the Mississippi in the latter half of the 17th century, including the sections now known as the Ohio River. The Wabash is considered a tributary of the Ohio River. Until the mid-18th century, however, the Ohio was considered a tributary of the Wabash. French traders had traveled north and south from Canada to the Gulf of Mexico via the Wabash; it served as a vital trade route for North American-French trade and was the river they knew best.

In the 18th century, the profitable 8-mile portage between the Maumee River and the Wabash was controlled by the Miami people at Kekionga.

The United States has fought five colonial and frontier-era battles on or near the river: the Battle of Vincennes (1779), St. Clair's Defeat (1791), the Attack on Fort Recovery (1794), the Battle of Tippecanoe (1811), and the Siege of Fort Harrison (1812). Several different conflicts have been referred to as the "Battle of the Wabash". A 329-acre (133 ha) remnant of the old-growth forests that once bordered the Wabash can be found at Beall Woods State Park, near Mount Carmel, Illinois. In the mid-19th century, the Wabash and Erie Canal, one of the longest canals in the world, was built along much of the river. Portions are still accessible in modern times, but most of the abandoned canal no longer exists. Its contribution to transportation was surpassed by construction of competing railroads.

The Wabash River between Terre Haute and the Ohio River was navigable by large ships during much of the 19th century, and was a regular stop for steamships. By the late 19th century, erosion due to farming and runoff made the Wabash impassable to such ships. Dredging could have resolved the problem, but was not undertaken because railroads had become the preferred form of transport. The 200-mile stretch south of Terre Haute includes several inoperable swing bridges.

== Course ==
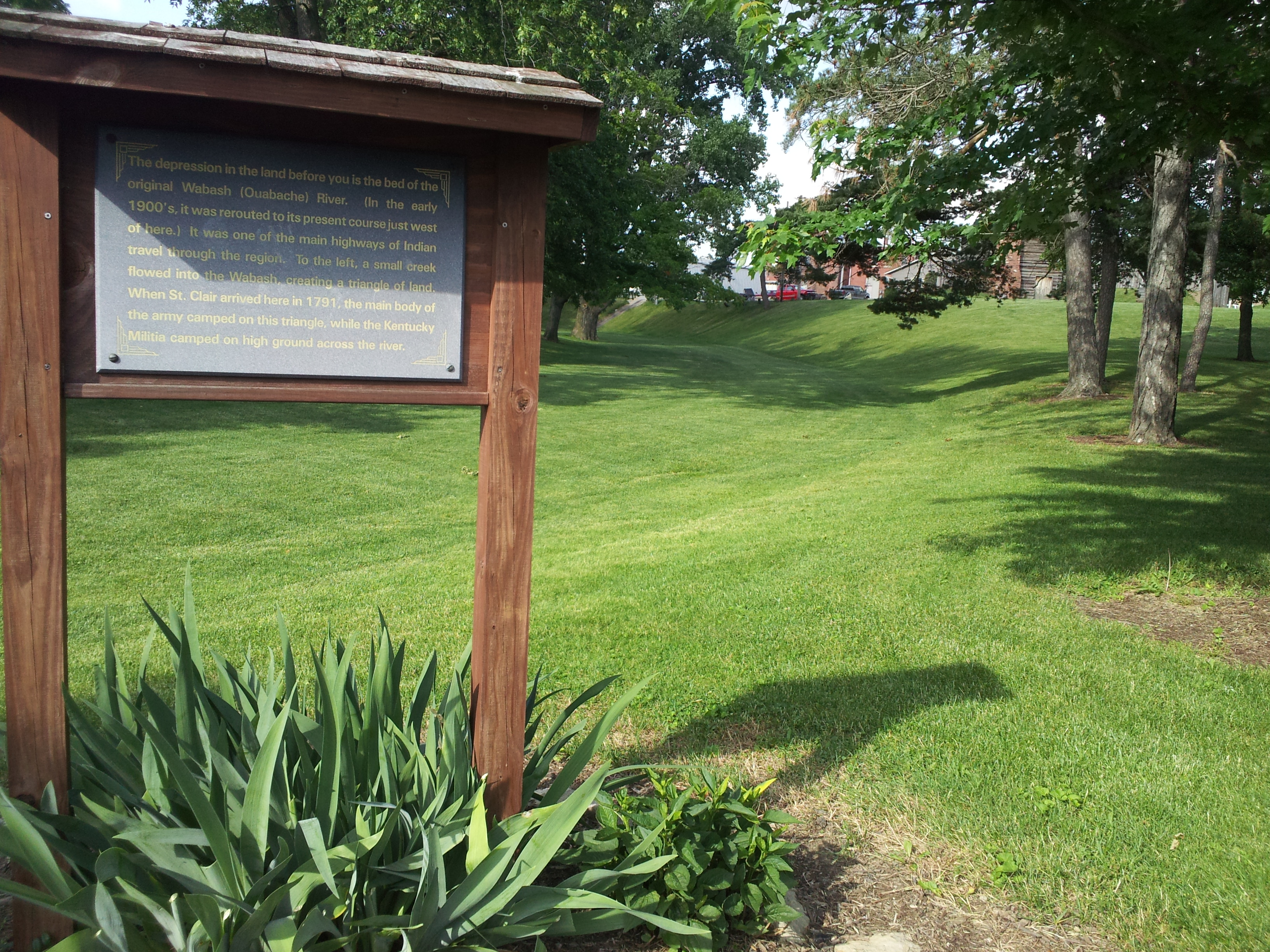
The former course of the Wabash River, running by the former site of the original Fort Recovery; the reproduction can be seen in the background, but it is not the original fort

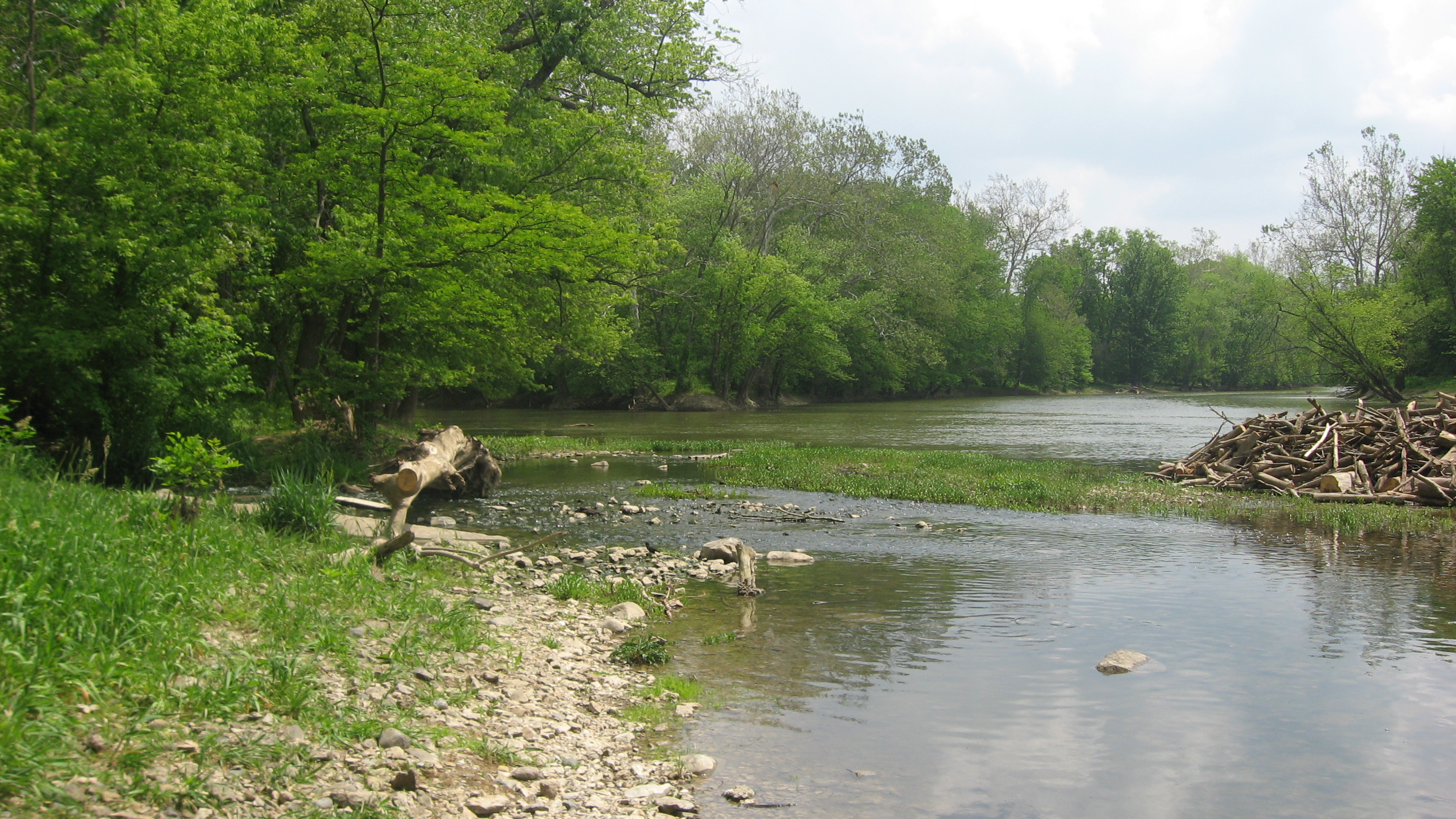
Forks of the Wabash at Huntington, Indiana

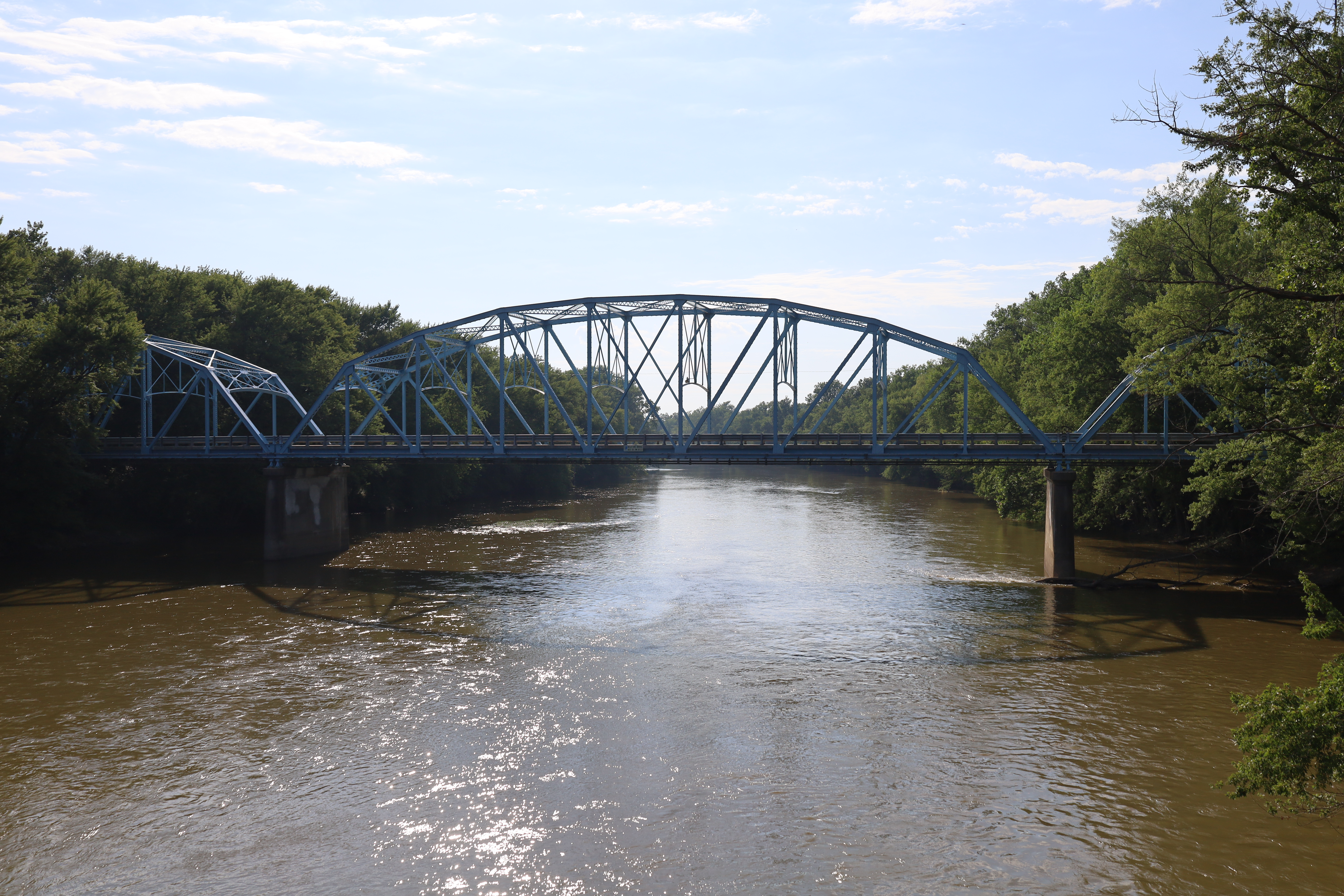
U.S. Route 31 Business crossing of the Wabash River in Peru, Indiana

The Wabash River rises four miles (6.4 km) south of Fort Recovery, Ohio, very near the Darke-Mercer County line about 1.5 miles (2.4 km) east of the Indiana-Ohio border. The water source is farmland drainage. A half-mile (0.8 km) downstream (i.e. east), at a roadside park on Ohio 49 at the Mercer County line, is a historical marker that announces the river's start. This land is also the portage for headwaters of the Mississinewa River, Stillwater River and West Fork of the White River, which lie just a few miles away.

Between the start of the river and Fort Recovery, the current is swift and the water remains very shallow and follows a poorly defined channel. The shallow depth and low bridge clearances make the section nearly impassable by boat except in the most ideal conditions. At mile seven and mile nine, two tributaries give the river a significant boost in volume, and at mile eleven the river flows past Fort Recovery. Two more tributaries add to the river's volume between Fort Recovery and Macedon at mile eighteen, making the river navigable for the remainder of its course. The river continues to flow northward passing the community of Wabash at mile twenty-three and then cutting sharply west, crossing into Indiana at mile twenty-eight.

Upon entering Indiana, the river has many sharp turns; these regularly lead to log jams that can block the river. Because of the many turns in the river, during the 1830s, the state created several separate canal channels to shorten the journey between the state line and Fort Wayne as part of the Wabash and Erie Canal project. The canals were abandoned after competing railroads took over; this allowed the river to shift courses several times, resulting in the formation of many cut-offs and coves with no outlet. The river has a maze-like quality in the first seventeen-mile (27 km) stretch as it enters Indiana.

At mile forty-five, the river becomes straighter with few sharp bends. An additional seventeen tributaries raise the depth of the river considerably, making it navigable for larger vessels. At mile fifty-nine, the river passes through Ouabache State Park, where it begins to widen and become more shallow. The white limestone river bottom can sometimes be seen in the area, whereas it is not visible due to pollution elsewhere downstream. As the river exits the park and flows toward the city of Bluffton near mile sixty-six, it widens further, becoming more shallow; only a narrow channel is navigable by larger vessels.

The river remains shallow and somewhat rocky with minor rapids until mile seventy-one near the community of Murray. There the river becomes calm and deeper until mile eighty-one, due to the dam and levee at the town of Markle. The lock that was formerly at the site is abandoned and a narrow washout is the only means to bypass the dam. In the rocky washout the river level drops four feet, making it one of the most dangerous points on the river. Boaters are advised to exit the river and reembark on the other side of the dam rather than traverse the washout.

At mile eighty-nine, the large Huntington Dam blocks the river. Built by the Army Corps of Engineers to make a reservoir, the dam creates the J. Edward Roush Lake. The lake is surrounded by park land and recreation areas and is about five miles (8 km) in length and a mile wide at its widest point. The mile-long (1.6 km) stretch after the Huntington Dam is rarely navigable. No lock connects the two sections of the river, and the water is often very shallow. A second smaller dam at mile ninety-one presents a dangerous hazard, and the section between it and the Huntington Dam has been closed to boaters.

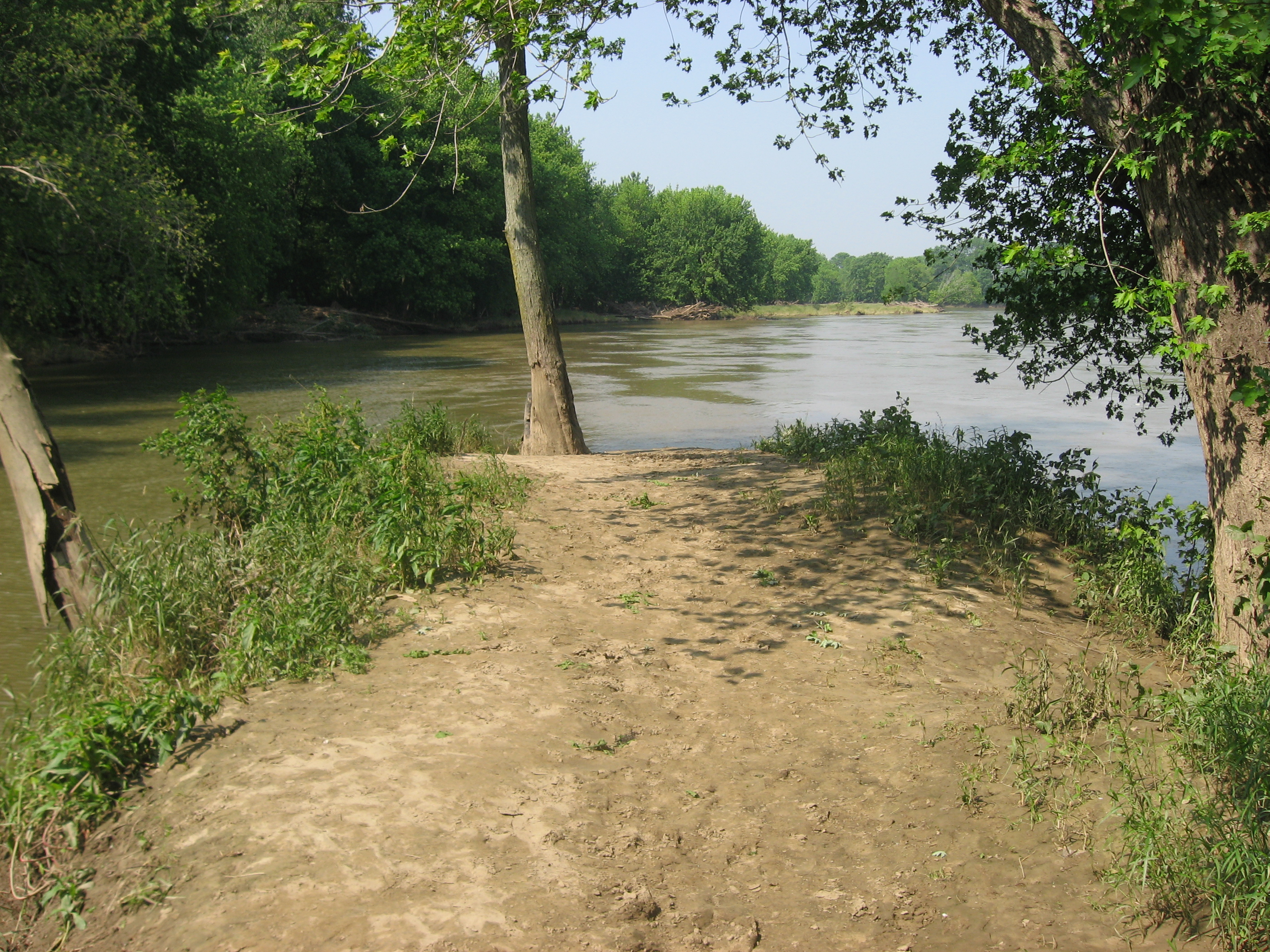
Sunset Point at Delphi, where Deer Creek joins the Wabash

At mile ninety-three the river is joined by its first major tributary, the Little River. The city of Huntington developed at the confluence of the two rivers. The tributary dramatically increases the volume of water in the Wabash at this point. Because of the dams on the Wabash, the Little River often carries more water than the Wabash. Additional minor tributaries raise the water level between Huntington and the city of Wabash. As the river passes Wabash and moves toward Peru, it splits, creating a series of islands; sandbars are common in the stretch. The river returns to a single channel at Peru, and flows through one of its most gentle stretches until reaching Logansport. Here the river again splits into multiple channels, divided by islands. Some of the channels are narrow and rocky, while the larger channels are navigable.

Between Logansport and Delphi, at mile 176, is one of the few remaining stretches of the Wabash and Erie canal. It can be accessed at Delphi. Just past Delphi, the Wabash's second major tributary, the Tippecanoe River, joins the river. The confluence of the two rivers is part of Prophetstown State Park, the site of the 1811 Battle of Tippecanoe. The flow of the Tippecanoe into the Wabash raises its level dramatically. At this point, most large power boats can easily navigate the river at cruising speed.

The river passes the city of Lafayette at mile 210 and gradually begins to end its westward flow, beginning a wide turn to the south. At mile 241, at the city of Covington, the river begins flowing due south. The river is deep at this point, but there are several gravel bars between Covington and Terre Haute. Terre Haute, beginning at mile 300, is among the largest cities in Indiana. Although navigable by large ships in the past, the remainder of the river becomes shallow in places due to erosion and silt. The river gradually widens moving south. It borders Illinois beginning at mile 316, and serves as a state boundary line with Indiana for the remainder of its course.

At Darwin, a farmer's cooperative operates the Wabash's only ferry service. It is used to take heavy farm equipment across the river. South of Darwin, beginning at mile 410 a large bluff gradually rises, eventually towering two-hundred feet over the river. The area is one of the most remote of the river, and it generally gives onto open land. The area becomes more densely populated as it nears the city of Vincennes at mile 441. Founded by the French about 1732, Vincennes is the oldest European settlement in Indiana, and among the oldest in the American Midwest. The city is sited on a strategic bend in the river that allowed it to control river traffic. Four miles west (6.4 km), as the river turns southward, another major tributary, the Embarras River joins.

Past Vincennes, the Wabash is joined by its largest tributary, the White River at Mount Carmel, Illinois, significantly increasing its size, to over 750 feet (230 m) wide. Roughly one mile (1.6 km) downstream, near the Gibson Generating Station, another large tributary, the Patoka River, also joins. During low water, there are rapids at the confluence, caused by an old canal lock that was abandoned after flooding. Further downstream, the river zig-zags, creating the "tail" of Gibson County, a panhandle between the river and Posey County. From the tail southward there are several cut-offs from the river, resulting in several natural exclaves between Indiana and Illinois, the largest of which is at Grayville. A flood caused the river to change course, disconnecting a two-mile (3 km) long stretch of the river and creating a lake entirely on the Illinois side. Between these exclaves is the historic town of New Harmony, a settlement created by Utopians during the 1810s. It is joined by the Black River on the Indiana side.

At mile 460, the river again splits into several channels. The area features sandy beaches and the largest islands in the river, some one mile (1.6 km) in length. The Little Wabash River, another major tributary, joins at mile 482 on the Illinois side, near New Haven. At mile 491 the Wabash flows into the Ohio River near Hovey Lake.

== Photos ==
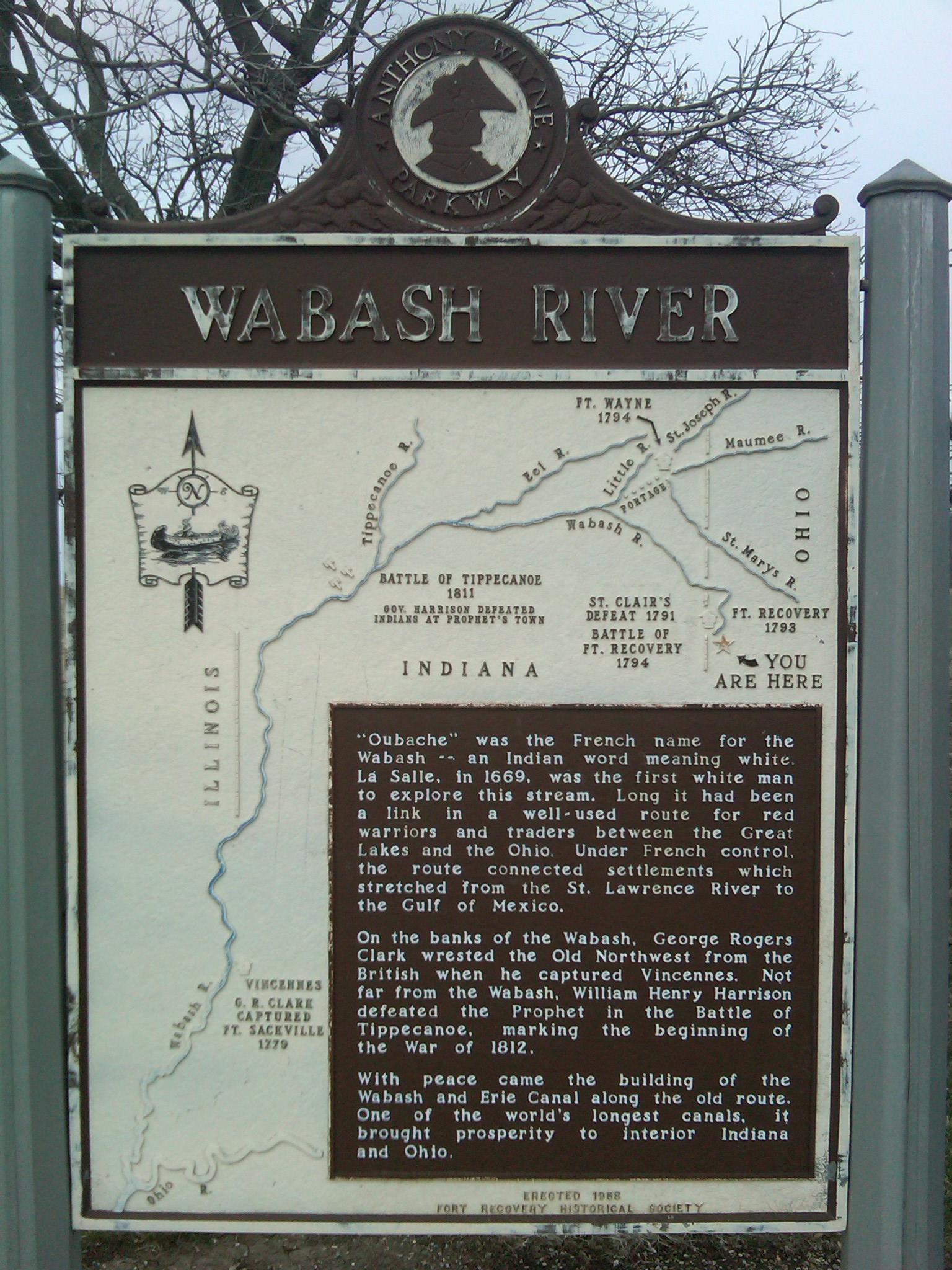
Wabash River historical marker in Mercer County just south of Fort Recovery

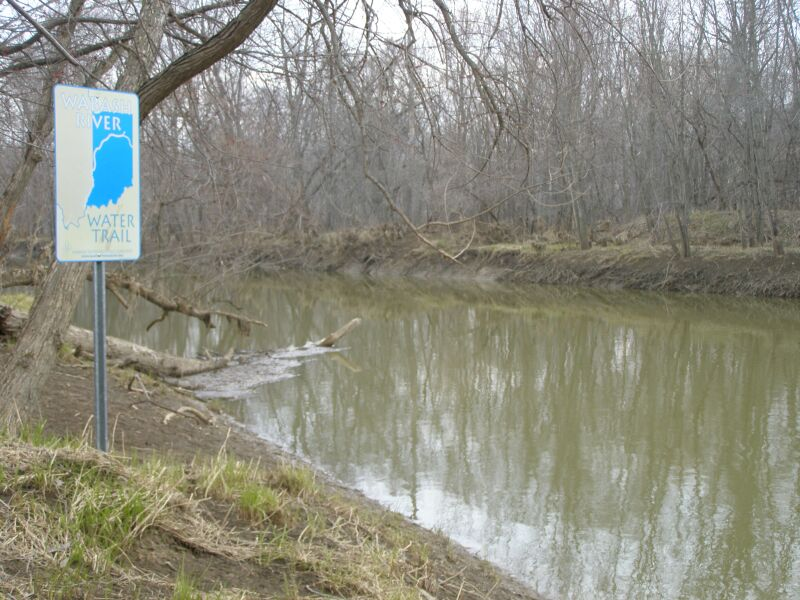
Wabash River in Limberlost Recreation Area, south of Berne, Indiana

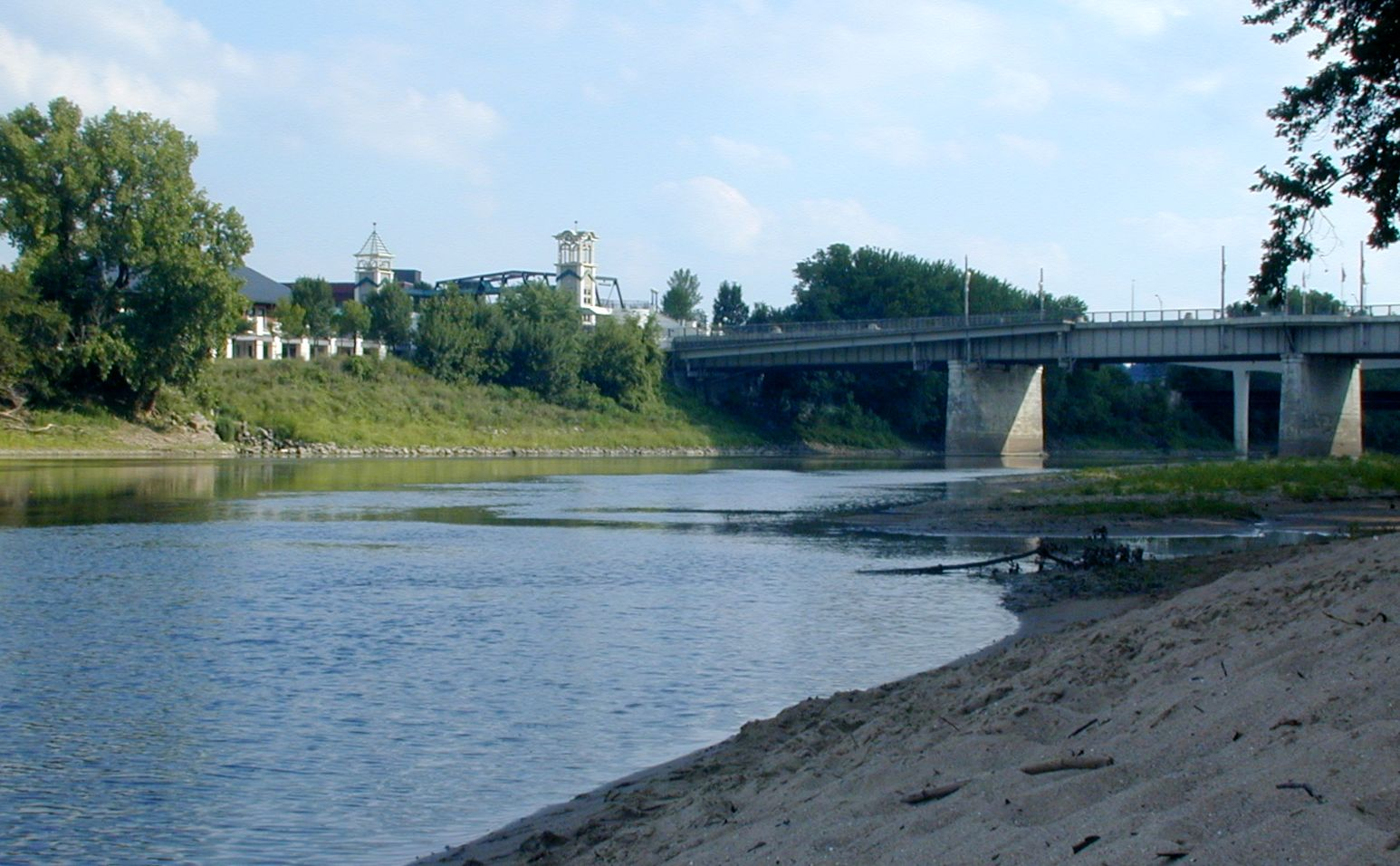
The Wabash River at Lafayette, Indiana, showing the Myers Pedestrian Bridge, and the Amtrak station; the river flows from left to right (north to south). This stretch is notable for large, sandy deposits.

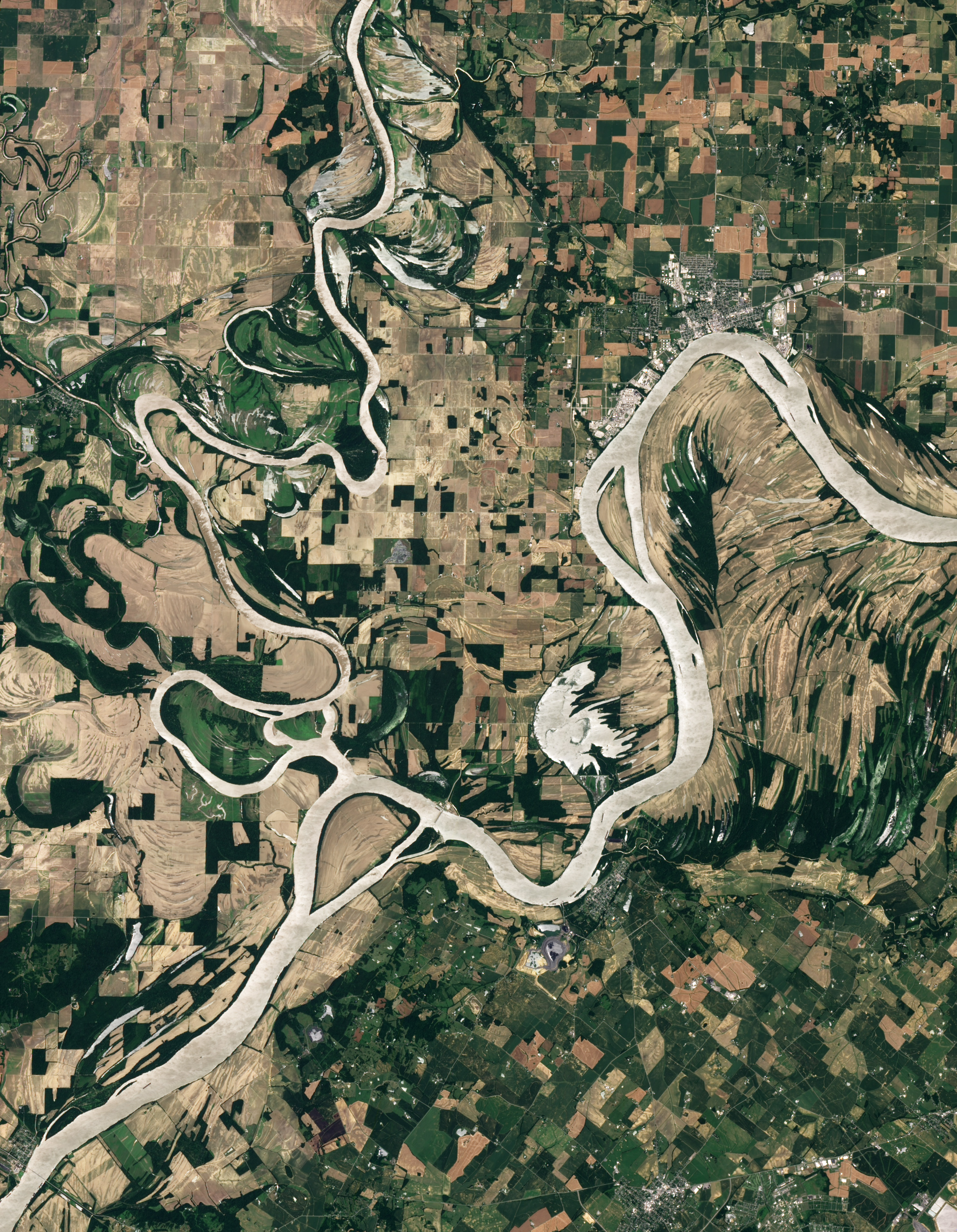
Natural-colour satellite image of the Wabash-Ohio confluence; Hovey Lake is to the left between the bend in the Ohio River

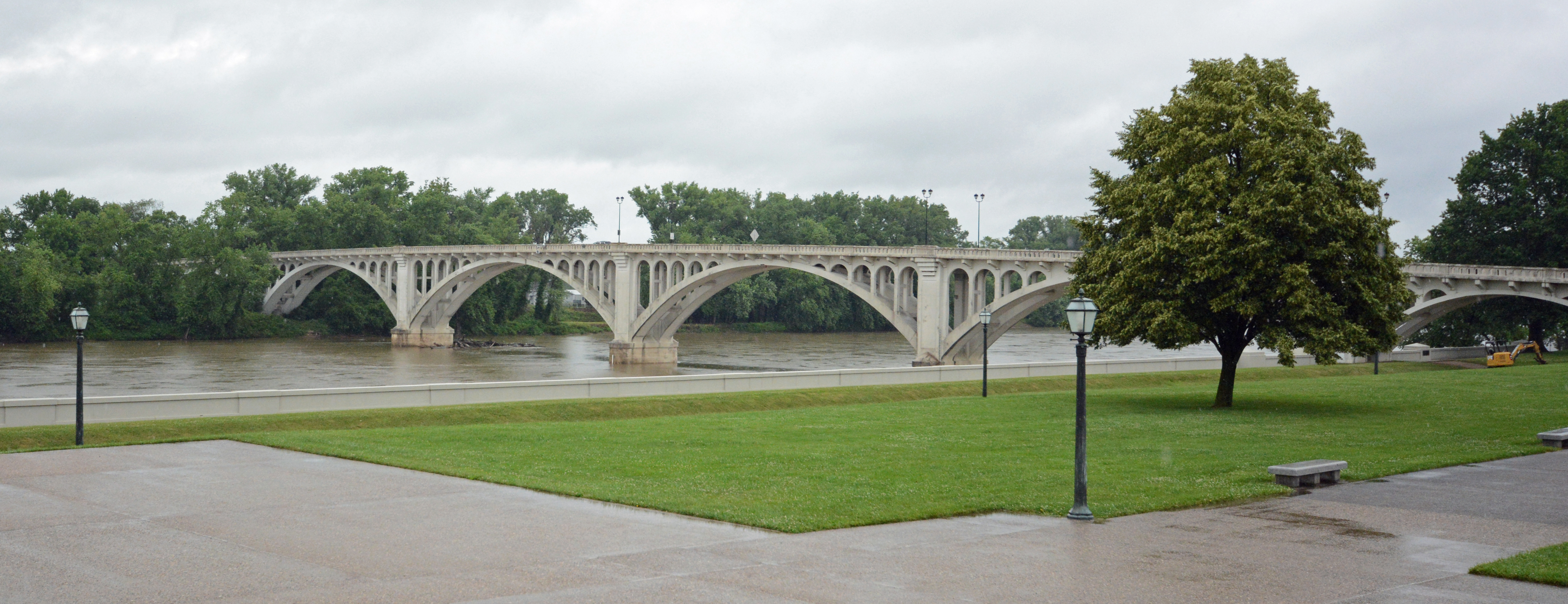
Lincoln Memorial Bridge over the Wabash River near the George Rogers Clark National Historical Park

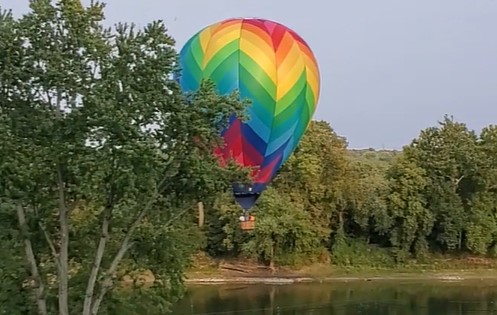
Hot air balloon dips low over the Wabash River

== Hydrology ==
The Wabash is the 24th largest by discharge volume and 38th longest river in the United States.

== Major tributaries ==
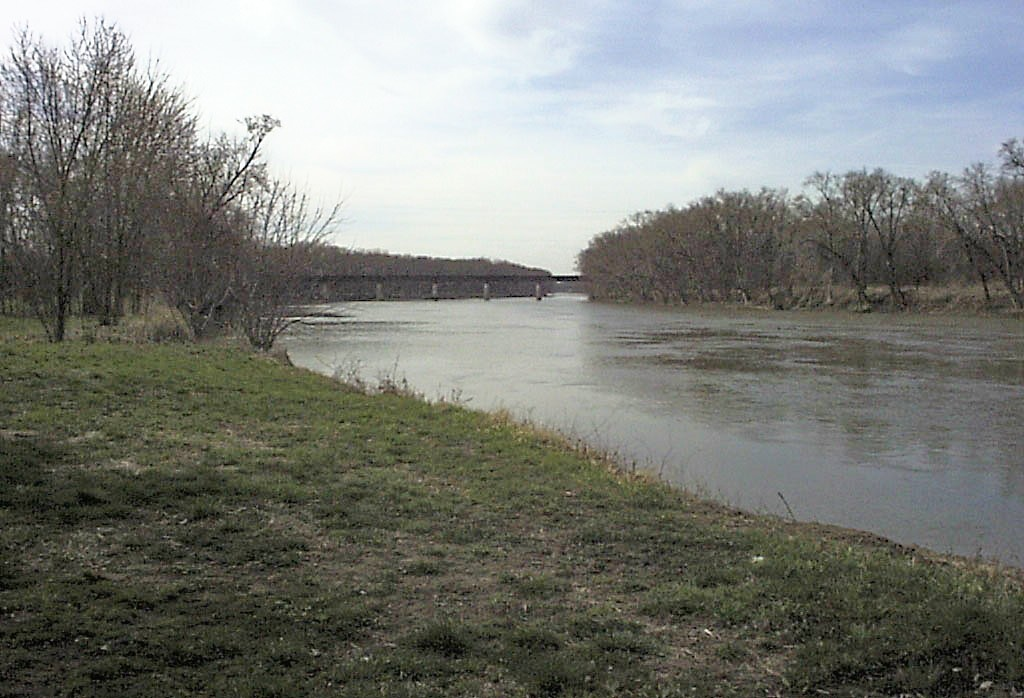
The Wabash River by Covington, Indiana

The major tributaries of the Wabash River include:

right tributaries

- Tippecanoe River (Indiana)
- Embarras River (Illinois)
- Little Wabash River (Illinois)
- Vermilion River (Illinois and Indiana)
- Eel River (Indiana)
- Little River (Indiana)

left tributaries

- White River (Indiana)
- Mississinewa River (Indiana)
- Patoka River (Indiana)
- Sugar Creek (Indiana)
- Wildcat Creek (Indiana)
- Salamonie River (Indiana)

== Cities and towns along the Wabash ==
=== Illinois ===
- Allendale
- Grayville
- Hutsonville
- Maunie
- Mount Carmel
- St. Francisville

=== Indiana ===
- Andrews
- Attica
- Bluffton
- Clinton
- Covington
- Delphi
- Huntington
- Lafayette
- Lagro
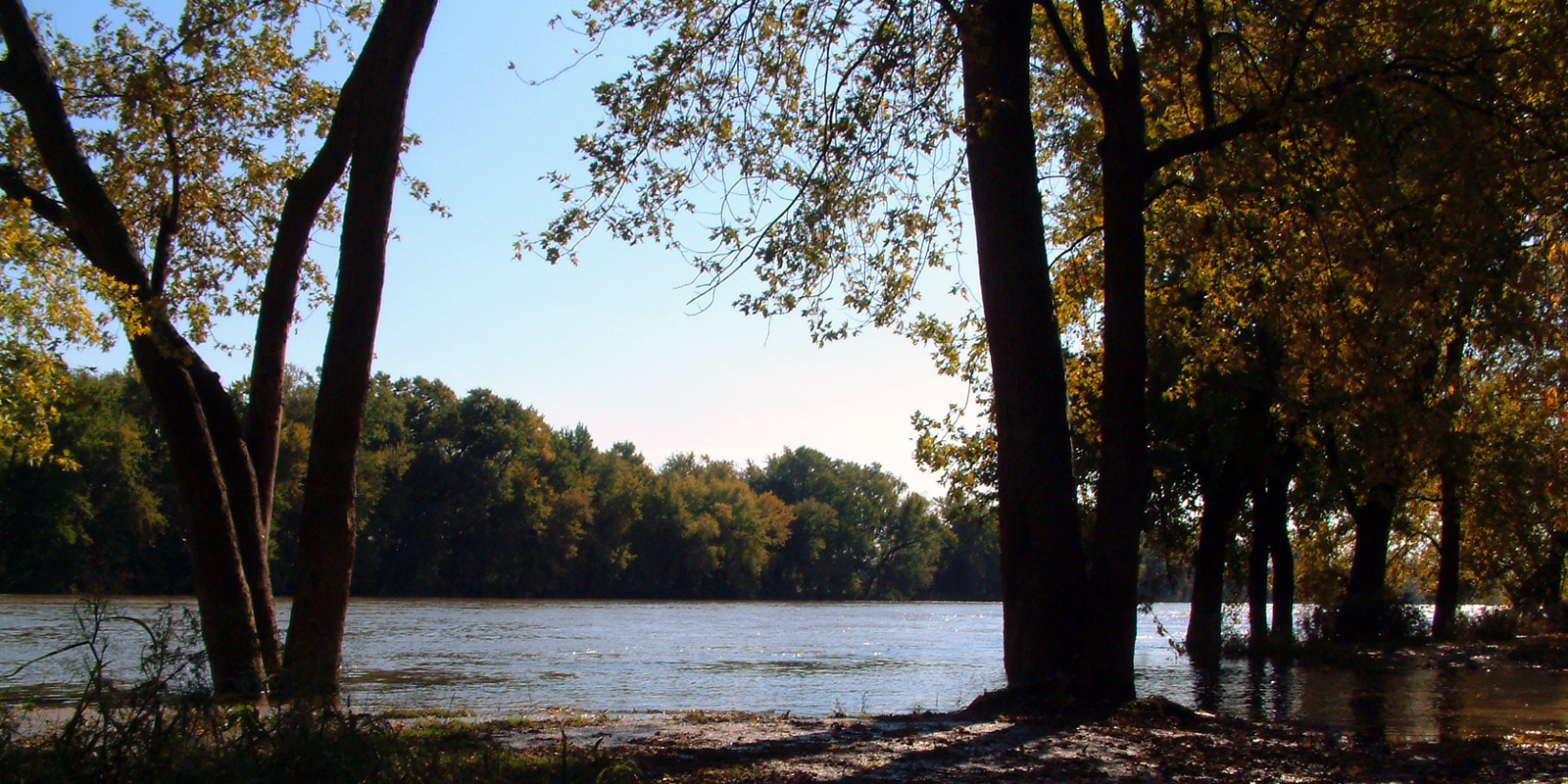
  The Wabash River alongside Williamsport, Indiana
- Logansport
- Markle
- Merom
- Montezuma
- Newport
- New Harmony
- Perrysville
- Peru
- Terre Haute
- Vincennes
- Wabash
- West Lafayette
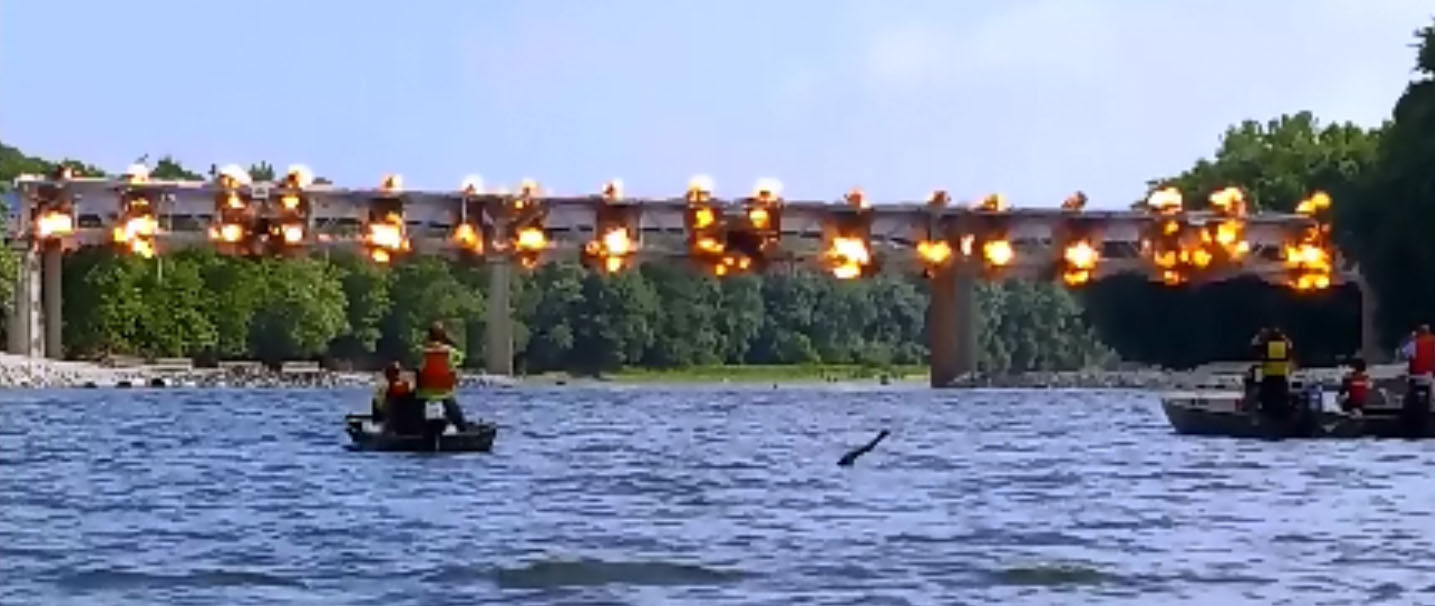
  Demolition of the U.S. 52 bridge over the Wabash River 2016
- Williamsport

=== Ohio ===
- Fort Recovery

== Fauna ==
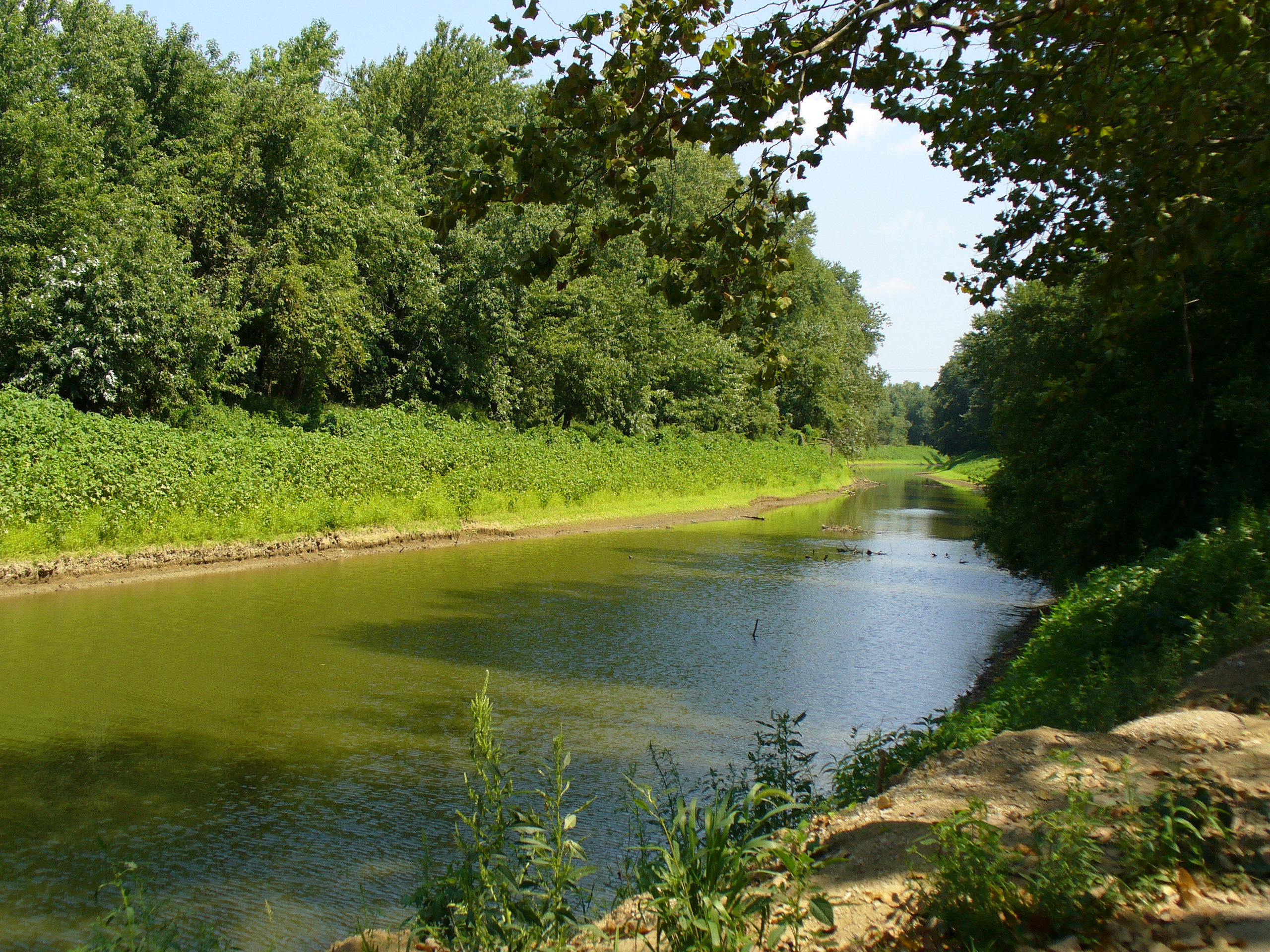
A small island and water fowl wildlife refuge in the Wabash near Mount Carmel, Illinois

The Wabash River supports an abundant and diverse wildlife population. At least 150 species of birds have been sighted around the river. The waterfowl are most dependent on the river. Black-crowned and Yellow-crowned night heron, and merlin inhabit the area. Several species of shorebirds build nest on or near the banks of the river. The river is home to many species of fish including species of bass, sunfish, crappie, catfish, carp, and others. Aquatic reptiles including snakes and turtles also occur in the river. A number of amphibians occur throughout the river's watershed including the American bullfrog and the eastern newt. Crayfish are also common throughout the river.

== See also ==
- List of Illinois rivers
- List of Indiana rivers
- List of rivers of Ohio
- Watersheds of Illinois
