= USS Wakiva II =

Steam yacht and First World War armed yacht

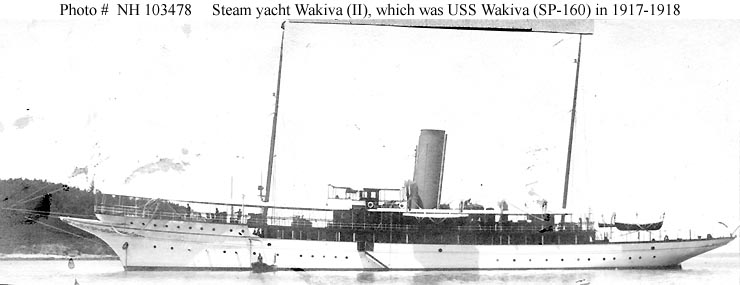
- Wakiva II in civilian service

History

United States
- Name: Wakiva II
- Owner: 1907: Lamon V. Harkness; 1915: Executors of Lamon V. Harkness
- Operator: 1917: United States Navy
- Port of registry: New York
- Builder: Ramage & Ferguson, Leith
- Yard number: 209
- Launched: 1 March 1907
- Completed: April 1907
- Acquired: for the US Navy, 20 July 1917
- Commissioned: 6 August 1917
- Refit: 1917
- Identification: pennant number SP-160
- Fate: Sunk by collision, 22 May 1918

General characteristics
- Type: steam yacht
- Tonnage: 909 GRT, 337 NRT
- Length: 239 ft 6 in (73.0 m) overall; 213.2 ft (65.0 m) registered
- Beam: 30.6 ft (9.3 m)
- Draft: 15 ft 0 in (4.57 m)
- Depth: 18.0 ft (5.5 m)
- Decks: 2
- Installed power: 230 NHP
- Propulsion: 2 × quadruple-expansion engines; 2 × screws
- Speed: 15 knots (28 km/h)
- Armament: 4 × 3-inch/50-caliber guns; 2 × .30-cal (7.62-mm) machine guns; depth charges; mines

USS Wakiva II (SP-160) was a steel-hulled steam yacht that was built in Scotland for Lamon V. Harkness in 1907, and converted into an armed yacht in 1917. She was a United States Navy convoy escort from Brest, France from October 1917. That November she attacked and almost certainly sank an enemy U-boat. She was sunk in May 1918 by a collision that killed two of her crew.

== Private steam yacht ==
In 1903 Ramage & Ferguson of Leith, near Edinburgh, launched a 192-foot (59 m) steam yacht for Lamon V. Harkness. In 1907 the same builders launched a larger yacht for Harkness, also called Wakiva. Both yachts were officially registered as "Wakiva", but the second is commonly called Wakiva II to avoid confusion.

Wakiva II's lengths were 239 ft 6 in (73.0 m) overall and 213.2 ft (65.0 m) registered. Her beam was 30.6 ft (9.3 m), her depth was 18.0 ft (5.5 m), and her draft was 15 ft 0 in (4.57 m). Her tonnages were 853 GRT and 337 NRT.

The ship had twin screws, each driven by a three-cylinder quadruple-expansion steam engine. The combined power of her twin engines was rated at 230 NHP, and gave her a speed of 15 knots (28 km/h).

Harkness registered Wakiva II at New York. He and his family, including his son Harry, used her in waters ranging from the North Sea to the Dutch East Indies.

By 1914, Edward L. Doheny had acquired the earlier Wakiva. Lamon Harkness remained the owner of Wakiva II until he died in 1915, whereupon she passed to his executors.

== Naval armed yacht ==
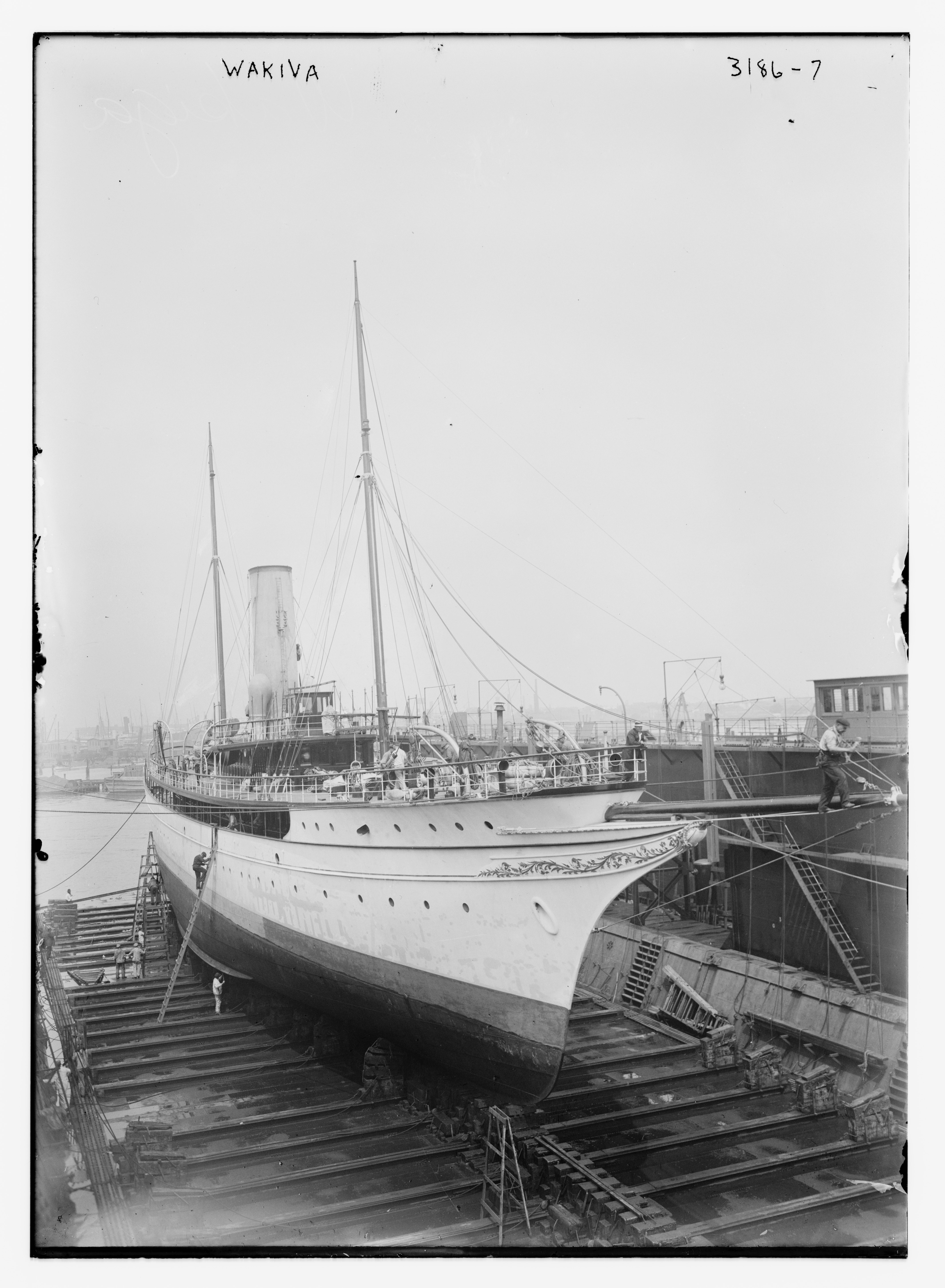
Wakiva as a civilian yacht, in dry dock

The US Navy acquired Wakiva on 20 July 1917, and commissioned her at Boston Navy Yard on 6 August as USS Wakiva II, with the pennant number SP-160 Lieutenant Commander Thomas R Kurtz, USNRF was appointed as her commanding officer. On 18 August, before her conversion into a warship was complete, Captain Thomas P Magruder, the Commander of Squadron Four, Patrol Force, raised his burgee pennant aboard her to maker his flagship. A week later, Wakiva II left Boston for Provincetown, Massachusetts with Squadron Four, which included six French Navy submarine chasers and several patrol boats and converted fishing craft.

On 26 August, Wakiva II and Squadron Four left Massachusetts for France. En route, the naval trawler USS P. K. Bauman broke down, so Wakiva II took her in tow. They called at Ponta Delgada in the Azores from 6 to 11 September, and reached Brest, France on 18 September. Nine days later, Captain Magruder hauled down his pennant from Wakiva II to establish his headquarters ashore.

In 28 September Wakiva II began convoy escort duty, by putting to sea to meet a convoy 75 nautical miles (139 km) west of Ushant. She remained on convoy duty until she was sunk the following year. On 28 October 1917, Wakiva II and USS Alcedo rescued survivors from the troopship Finland, which had been disabled by a torpedo. Wakiva II launched two of her boats, and members of her crew also crewed one of Finland's lifeboats. Wakiva II picked up 126 of Finland's survivors and landed them at Brest.

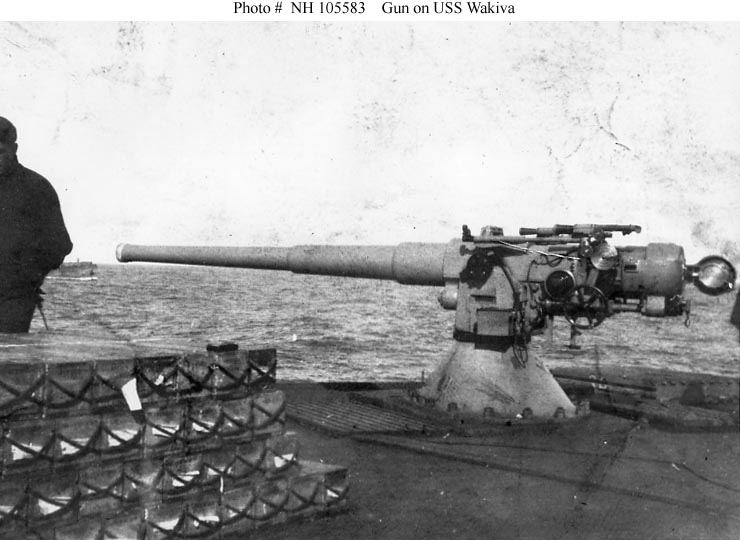
One of the 3-inch/50-caliber guns aboard Wakiva II' in 1917 or 1918

On 23 November 1917, Wakiva II sighted an object at 500 yards (460 m) range that they took to be a U-boat conning tower. Her crew went to general quarters, she sped toward the object, and she opened fire. After firing seven rounds, Wakiva II got close enough for her crew to see that the object was a convincingly-painted dummy for target practice.

On 28 November Wakiva II left Saint-Nazaire to join and escort a westbound convoy. An oiler in the convoy, USS Kanawha, fired two Very flares and sounded her whistle. Wakiva II sounded general quarters and made full speed ahead to screen Kanawha's port beam, while the armed yacht USS Noma closed to screen her starboard beam. After 30 minutes no enemy was sighted, so the three ships rejoined the van of the convoy.

As soon as they rejoined the convoy, Noma sounded the alarm and launched a depth charge at what her crew believed to be a U-boat. Wakiva II took up general quarters again, and headed for Noma. While still 1 1/2 nautical miles (3 km) from Nova, Wakiva II sighted a periscope at a range of 100 yards (91 m). She turned hard-a-port and opened fire with her after guns. Her third salvo was thought to have sheared the periscope.

As Wakiva II passed over the suspected U-boat a second time, she launched a salvo of depth charges. As they exploded, oil and débris came to the surface. Her number one gun hit the wreckage with two shots. As Wakiva II made a third pass, she sighted three men clinging to wreckage. She turned full circle to pick them up, but by the time she reached the spot, only oil and wreckage remained.

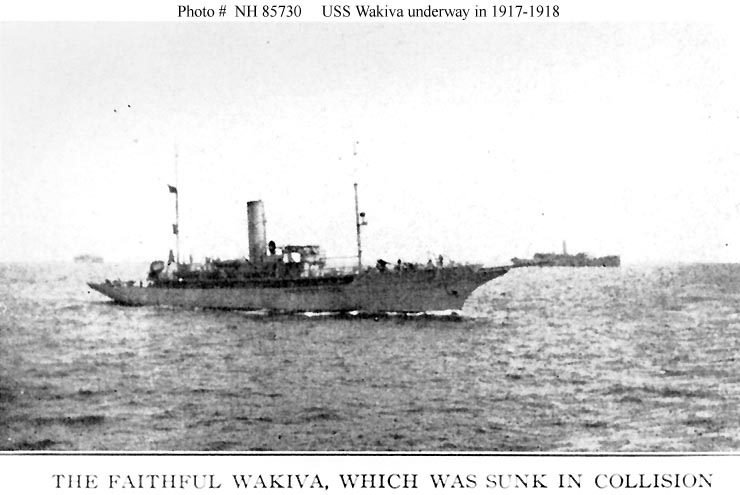
Wakiva II on convoy duty in 1917 or 1918.

In his action report after the engagement, Wakiva II's commanding officer praised his crew as a "perfect fighting unit" that showed "admirable coolness and courage", and did not manifest any nervousness or inefficiency. The UK Admiralty credited Wakiva II with only a "probably seriously damaged" U-boat. However, both Vice Admiral Henry Wilson, who commanded US Navy forces on the French coast, and Admiral William Sims, who commanded US naval forces in European waters, commended Wakiva II.

On 12 February 1918, Wakiva and two other armed yachts; USS Corsair and May; were escorting three cargo ships. Wakiva II sighted a U-boat running on the surface dead astern. She signalled a warning to the three cargo ships, and opened fire with her number two and number four 3-inch guns. Momentarily she had to suspend fire, to avoid hitting the USSB cargo ship Florence H., which was just beyond where the U-boat had appeared. The U-boat submerged, and Wakiva II hunted her for 90 minutes without finding her.

== Loss ==
Wakiva II continued to patrol from Brest. On 21 May she was part of the escort of a convoy of eight ships. Shortly after sunset, fog set in, so the convoy reduced speed. Wakiva II took station with the 5,448 GRT cargo ship USS Wabash. The convoy had been zigzagging as an anti-submarine precaution, but this ceased as visibility reduced. The armed yacht Noma signalled the convoy commodore aboard the troopship USS Black Arrow to this effect.

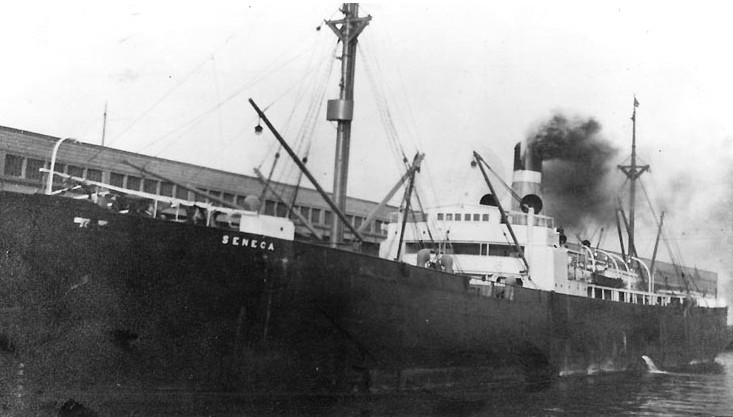
USS Wabash, previously Seneca

By 03:00 hrs on 22 May, visibility briefly improved, but the convoy then entered another fog bank. At 03:10 hrs Wakiva II's crew heard Wabash's whistle, but could not see her. Wabash whistled again, whereupon Wakiva II's commanding officer, Lieutenant Commander EG Allen, ordered her helm on point (11.25 degrees) a-port. Ten seconds later, Wabash whistled a third time.

Wabash now appeared from the fog. Allen telegraphed full ahead and ordered the helm to port. But Wabash's bow struck Wakiva II's starboard quarter, just abaft the mainmast and forward of the after guns, and cutting into the yacht's hull from her main deck down to her starboard propeller shaft. The general alarm was sounded aboard the yacht. The impact threw the starboard sides of the two ships against each other, and carried away Wabash's starboard lifeboats. Then the two ships parted, and Wabash slowly moved astern of Wakiva II.

Wakiva II carried depth charges and mines on the fantail of her stern. Chief Gunner's Mate Oliver P. Cooper, USNRF, ran aft, removed the detonating pins from every mine, set every mine to "safe", and within five minutes reported that all was secure. Electrician Second Class Charles E. Kirkpatrick, UNSRF, was on duty as Wakiva II's wireless telegraphist. He remained at his post, transmitting distress signals, and did not abandon ship until the last possible moment. Chief Boatswain's Mate Thomas Olson, USNRF, rigged out the motor whaleboat and rousted out men from below decks. Then he and Allen inspected and cleared the ship. As the engine room flooded, Machinist Mate First Class Charles AA Smith began to start her pumps, then realised that they could not cope with the rate at which water was entering the hull.

Two of Wakiva II's crew were killed. At 03:30 hrs the survivors pulled clear in her boats. Six minutes later she sank by the stern off Île d'Yeu at position 46.5989°N 2.4180°W. Wabash lowered her boats and rescued the survivors.

== Bibliography ==
- Lloyd's Register of Yachts. London: Lloyd's Register of Shipping. 1907 – via Internet Archive.
- Lloyd's Register of Yachts. London: Lloyd's Register of Shipping. 1914 – via Internet Archive.
- Lloyd's Register of Yachts. London: Lloyd's Register of Shipping. 1915 – via Internet Archive.
