= USS P. K. Bauman =

American mine warfare vessel of World War I

History

United States
- Name: Philip K. Bauman
- Namesake: Former owner's name retained upon commissioning
- Owner: Douglas Company, Inc., of Reedville, Virginia
- Builder: M. M. Davis and Son, Solomons, Maryland
- Completed: 1912
- Acquired: 28 May 1917
- Commissioned: 10 August 1917
- Identification: Official number: 210557
- Fate: Struck rock and foundered 12 January 1918
- Notes: Menhaden fishing trawler

General characteristics
- Type: Fishing vessel; Mine sweeper
- Tonnage: 304 tons gross
- Length: 158 ft 0 in (48.2 m) LOA; 146.5 ft (44.7 m) Registered
- Beam: 23.9 ft (7.3 m)
- Draft: 8 ft 8 in (2.64 m) mean
- Depth: 11 ft (3.4 m)
- Installed power: Steam, 1 boiler
- Propulsion: 3 cyl steam engine, 600 IHP
- Speed: 12 knots
- Armament: 2 × 3-inch guns; 2 × machine guns

Philip K. Bauman was built in 1912 by M. M. Davis and Son, Solomons, Maryland, as a Menhaden fishing trawler, official number 210557. The steam powered vessel was built for the Douglas Company, Inc., of Reedville, Virginia. It had a single three cylinder steam engine with one boiler. The vessel was 146.5 ft (44.7 m) registered length, 23.9 ft (7.3 m) beam, with a depth of 11 ft (3.4 m). A single boiler powered a three-cylinder steam engine of 600 I.H.P.

The vessel was purchased by the United States Navy from the Douglas Company for $110,000 on or about 28 May 1917 for service in World War I, designated SP-377, and commissioned as USS P. K. Bauman (SP-377) at Norfolk, Virginia, on 10 August 1917.

The wooden-hulled vessel was among twelve Menhaden trawlers fitted out for mine sweeping in foreign service. Philip K. Bauman was fitted for the service at Norfolk. As the vessels for foreign service would require more defense and endurance they were fitted with two, rather than the one for domestic service, 3-inch guns and a requirement for a steaming radius of 2,000 miles.

All the trawlers were found to have problems including leaking, hogging, and severe stability issues. Eleven of the trawlers, after modifications, made the Atlantic crossing. After one foundered in a storm all the trawlers were relieved of escort duties, had one gun and some ballast removed to reduce draft to one more suitable for the work, and assigned only to mine sweeping. They were then equipped with French designed sweeping gear.

P. K. Bauman was assigned to Squadron 4, Atlantic Patrol Force, for overseas escort duty. The squadron, commanded by Captain Thomas P. Magruder aboard his flagship, the armed yacht Wakiva II, departed Boston, Massachusetts, on 25 August 1917 for Provincetown, Massachusetts, then departed Provincetown on 26 August 1917 en route Brest, France. The squadron called at Ponta Delgada in the Azores from 6 September 1917 to 11 September 1917, Wakiva II having had to tow P. K. Bauman part of the way due to a breakdown in P. K. Bauman's propulsion system. The squadron arrived at Brest on 18 September 1917.

The vessel performed convoy escort duties and mine sweeping until problems with the former Menhaden trawlers resulted in further modifications for mine sweeping exclusively for the remainder of World War I. While patrolling off L’Orient, France, P. K. Bauman struck a rock on 12 January 1918. Listing badly, she was taken in tow by another of the former Menhaden trawler minesweepers Raymond J. Anderton, but eventually sank.
