= Armiesburg Covered Bridge =

- Coordinates: 39°45′33.27″N 87°21′4″W
- Carried: Lafayette Road (C.R. 600W)
- Crossed: Big Raccoon Creek
- Official name: Armiesburg Covered Bridge
- Named for: Armiesburg, Indiana

History
- Constructed by: Henry Wolf, Indiana
- Opened: 1854
- Collapsed: 1913 Flood

The Armiesburg Covered Bridge was on the south side of Armiesburg, Indiana. The Long Truss with arch covered bridge structure was built by Henry Wolf in 1907 and destroyed by the Great Flood of 1913.

== History ==
The site that would later become Armiesburg had been the original crossing spot for General William Henry Harrison in 1811 on his way to the Battle of Tippecanoe. In 1812 General Samuel Hopkins would camp his army nearby. This is why it is called Armiesburg and not just Armyburg. Armiesburg was once a thriving community with a mill, stores, and population. It was the second county seat with court held there in 1827. Many flatboats were launched and passed Armiesburg carrying out of Parke County pork, grain, whiskey, lumber, and other products on their way to the South and New Orleans.

A mill was built by either Abner Cox in the 1820s or Solomon Allen in 1827. John W. Underwood would later operate the mill. This first mill was built of logs with a brush dam. Later Arthur Patterson would replace it with a three-story frame structure with a log dam. James Patterson, Judge J.Y. Patterson, and J.W. Russel would go on to operate the mill in later years. In 1890 Aquilla Laverty bought and remodeled and modernized the mill. He added a stone basement, new roller mills, steam engine, and a stone dam. While trying to relocate the mill to his farm, to be used as a steam-powered mill and elevator, in late November 1896 he fell from the building and died 5 days later on December 1. The mill was never rebuilt.

The County Commissioners had decided in 1852 to build a bridge at Armiesburg. When rumors of the proposed bridge began to leak county residents protested. The County Commissioners called a special meeting to discuss the bridge and found the various groups wanted bridges built at other locations throughout the county. The Commissioners decided to postpone the bridge for another year.

By June 1854 the County Commissioners were able to authorize the Armiesburg Covered Bridge. They allowed $5,500 the first year with an additional $2,000 a year later, there were also $700 in public donations. Over the years it seems that Parke County's earliest bridge builder, Henry Wolf, has been confused with his son Aaron Wolf. The fact is that Aaron J. Wolf was actually born in Armiesburg in 1854 while Henry was building the bridge. Aaron would go on to be a successful sawmill operator in Waveland, Indiana and hold several Parke County offices.

Surviving photos of the bridge show that it clearly did not have the Kingposts of a Burr Arch structure. This would be one of the few bridges in Parke County not use the Burr Arch style of construction. J.J. Daniels would go on to use Burr Arch construction exclusively in the bridges he would build in Parke County even though at the time the Armiesburg Bridge was built he and his father Stephen Daniels were using Colonel Long's patented Long Truss on bridges they were building in Ohio.

Some of the wood used in construction of the bridge was sawn at the nearby Armiesburg Mill. Julius Egbert and Chariton Britton used a whipsaw to cut the logs. Chariton Britton would later give this saw to his son Joseph A. Britton, Parke County's other bridge building giant.

== See also ==
- Parke County Covered Bridges
- Parke County Covered Bridge Festival
