= Wigham Richardson =

British shipbuilding company

The Wigham Richardson shipbuilding company was named after its founder, John Wigham Richardson (1837-1908), the son of Edward Richardson, a tanner from Newcastle upon Tyne, and Jane Wigham from Edinburgh.

== History ==
The Company was set up with less than £5,000, given to Richardson by his father in 1860. This was enough for him to found the Neptune Shipyard at Wallsend.

Its first ship, a 65 ft (20 m) paddle steamer called Victoria, was launched on the River Tyne that summer. She was commissioned to carry passengers, carts and livestock between Portsmouth and the Isle of Wight, and is thought to have cost around £700.

At least part of Wigham Richardson's success in the latter part of the 19th century was through the surge in demand for passenger ships, taking emigrants to the New World.

In 1903, Wigham Richardson merged with Swan and Hunter specifically to bid for the prestigious contract to build the RMS Mauretania. Their bid was successful, and she went on to capture the Blue Riband for the fastest crossing of the Atlantic - a record she held for two decades. Even today, she is the largest liner ever built on the Tyne.

The company flourished, and between 1906 and 1912, no other company in the world could match it in terms of the tonnage of shipping produced. In 1907, for example, 15% of the world's shipping, in tonnage terms, was built by Swan Hunter and Wigham Richardson.

== Wigham Richardson's ships ==
Ships built by Wigham Richardson's Neptune Yard, prior to the merger with Swan Hunter included:

- Potosi - POTOSI (2) was built in 1900 by Wigham Richardson & Co. at Newcastle with a tonnage of 5300grt, a length of 400 ft 6in, a beam of 50 ft and a service speed of 13 knots. Although built for the Valparaiso service, due to lack of trade, she was sold immediately on completion to the Russian Volunteer Fleet and renamed Kazan. In 1904 she was captured by the Japanese Navy Department and renamed Kasato Maru. She sailed to Brazil, bringing immigrants to the booming coffee plantations. She was acquired by Osaka Shosen K. K. in 1918 who retained her name but later amended it to Kasado Maru, later being converted to a freighter in WW2. In August 1945 she was bombed by Russian aircraft in the Bering Sea.
- Bathori - A single screw steam schooner, 285 ft (87 m) long, built in 1892 for Royal Hungarian Sea Navigation Co. She flew the Austro-Hungarian flag.
- Castelbank (later renamed Aidar) - Built in 1883 for G Tweedy & Co of Liverpool, and sank in 1896 following a boiler failure in the Mediterranean. Aidar was owned at the time by London Steamers and was carrying a cargo of grain and oil cakes between Odesa and Marseille. The crew were rescued by a steamship called Staffordshire.
- SS Clearwater (later renamed Ingalls and Yosemite) - A steamer built in 1894 and acquired by the US War Department in 1899. She was renamed Ingalls and used as an army transport ship until 1910 when she was transferred to the Navy. Renamed Yosemite, she remained in reserve before being decommissioned and scrapped in 1912.
- CS Colonia - Built in 1902, at over 500 ft (150 m) long, Colonia was the largest cable-laying ship in the world until 1926. She was responsible for laying a cable from Sennen Cove, Cornwall, to Bay Roberts, Newfoundland, and from there to New York City. The cable was reportedly around 3,370 miles (5,420 km) in length, and weighed 13,500 tons.
- Dryburgh Abbey - Built in 1881, 2311 tons, Cargo ship, renamed Kut Sang, Kichisho Maru, Kissho Maru, sank after collision in 1923.
- SS Elisabeth Rickmer - Built in 1896 for Norddeutscher Lloyd, of Bremen, Germany, she was 410 ft (120 m) long.
- Europa - Built in 1884 for the Lavarello Line of Italy, this single screw passenger ship was capable of 12 knots (22 km/h; 14 mph) and offered accommodation for 75 in first class, 52 in second class and 750 in third. She ran between Genoa and South America, for several different owners, until being scrapped in 1893.
- Hannover - One of the larger passenger ships of her day, Hannover was built in 1899 for North German Lloyd of Bremen. She had a single funnel, twin screws and was almost 430 ft (130 m) long. Hannover had room for 120 people in second class and 1,850 in third class and made regular crossings between Germany and the United States and Canada until the outbreak of the First World War. She was then laid up at Bremen and surrendered to Britain in 1919. Two years later she was resold to North German Lloyd and refitted before resuming crossings between Bremen and New York. She was scrapped in 1932.
- Malang - A steel cargo ship, built in 1898. After serving as a merchant ship in the Atlantic, she was acquired by the US Navy, in 1918, when she was fitted with two 4 inches (102 mm) guns. She carried a crew of 62 and travelled at up to 10 knots (19 km/h; 12 mph). She was decommissioned in 1919, and was returned to her owner, Rotterdamsche Lloyd.
- Port Fairy (later renamed Dona Maria and Italian) - Launched in 1887 as Port Fairy, she was renamed Dona Maria by her first owners, the Anglo-Australasian Steam Navigation Co of Newcastle. She offered accommodation for 50 first class and 700 third class passengers. After her maiden voyage to Australia in 1888, she was sold to the Andresen Line. Until 1903, she sailed between Lisbon and New York via the Azores. In 1907 she was sold to the Booth Line of Liverpool, and renamed Port Fairy, before being sold to Ellerman Lines in 1909, and renamed Italian. She was scrapped in 1913.
- Portia - A single screw schooner, built in 1885, 220 ft (67 m) long and 31 ft (9.4 m) across the beam. She was owned by CT Bowring & Co and registered at Liverpool.
- Sikh (later renamed Regina Elena, Georgia, and Shinsei Maru) - Sikh was built in 1889 for the Mogul Line, and was a single mast, single screw passenger ship, with accommodation for 25 second class and 1,100 third class passengers. She was bought by Puglia Societa di Navigazione of Bari, Italy in 1901 and renamed Regina Elena, travelling between Italy and the Americas. In 1904 she was sold to Unione Austriaca, renamed Georgia, and second class accommodation was upgraded to first class. Three years later, she was sold to Japanese owners and renamed Shinsei Maru. She was sunk by US aircraft in 1945 close to Taiwan.
- Silvia - An iron single screw schooner, built in 1885, which was unusual in that she was fitted with electric lights. She was owned by New York, Newfoundland & Halifax Steam Ships Co and registered at Liverpool.
- St Olaf - Built in 1871 for the Norse American Line, with accommodation for 30 first class and 500 third class passengers. She had a single funnel, a single screw and was capable of 10 knots (19 km/h; 12 mph). St Olaf's maiden voyage was from Bergen to New York and she continued on this service until 1875. She was sold and scrapped in 1903.
- Steinmann (later renamed Alexandre Smyers) - Built for the White Cross Line in 1872, with a top speed of 10 knots (19 km/h; 12 mph), she sailed regularly between Antwerp and New York until 1877. Steinmann was acquired by A.Smyers & Cie that year and renamed Alexandre Smyers. She sank off Hantsholm, Skagerrak in 1881.
- SS Urania - Built for Finland Steamship Co Ltd, she offered accommodation for 22 first class, 34 second class and 186 third class, and sailed between Finland, Copenhagen and Kingston upon Hull. She sank in 1913 after colliding in fog with SS Fancy, north west of Kullen, Kattegatt. Crew and passengers were rescued by Fancy, although herself badly damaged, and taken to Elsinore, Denmark.
- USS Wabash was a single-screw, steel-hulled freighter completed in 1900 for service with the Deutsche Dampferfahrts Gesellschaft later named USS Wabash when bought by the US Navy.
- Willowbank - An iron barque built in 1861, measuring 190 ft (58 m) in length and 32 ft (9.8 m) across the beam. She sank after colliding with the steamship City of Berlin off Portland in December 1895.
- SS Wittekind (later renamed Iroquois and Freedom) - A passenger liner, originally built by Blohm & Voss, Hamburg, in 1894, but substantially rebuilt by Wigham Richardson six years later. The company extended her from 383 ft (117 m) in length to 446 ft (136 m). At the outbreak of the First World War, she took shelter at Boston. In April 1917 she was seized by US authorities and was renamed Iroquois. In 1919 she was renamed Freedom, and was scrapped in 1924.
