= USS Anderton =

Minesweeper of the United States Navy

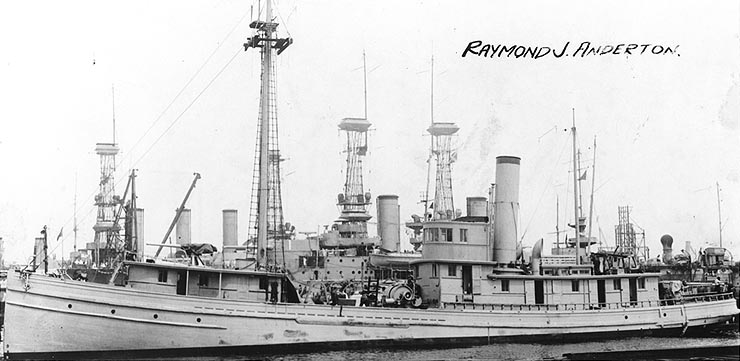
- USS Anderton (SP-530) Photographed probably at the Boston Navy Yard in Boston, Massachusetts, circa August 1917 while preparing for deployment overseas. Two battleships are in the background, with that in the center being either USS Delaware (Battleship # 28) or USS North Dakota (Battleship # 29).

History

United States
- Name: USS Raymond J. Anderton (1917); USS Anderton (1917-1919)
- Namesake: Raymond J. Anderton was her previous name retained; Anderton was a shortening of her name mandated by a Department of the Navy general order
- Builder: Robert Palmer and Son, Noank, Groton, Connecticut
- Completed: 1911
- Acquired: 18 June 1917
- Commissioned: 18 August 1917
- Decommissioned: 8 September 1919
- Fate: Returned to owner 1919
- Notes: In service as commercial fishing trawler Raymond J. Anderton 1911-1917 and 1919-1922

General characteristics
- Type: Patrol vessel and Minesweeper
- Tonnage: 290 gross register tons
- Length: 139 ft 6 in (42.52 m)
- Beam: 23 ft 0 in (7.01 m)
- Draft: 12 ft 0 in (3.66 m) mean
- Speed: 11 knots
- Armament: 1 × 3-inch (76.2-mm) gus; 2 × .30-caliber (7.62-mm) Colt machine guns; 1 × .30-caliber (7.62-mm) Lewis Gun

USS Anderton (SP-530), originally to have been USS Raymond J. Anderton (SP-530), was a patrol vessel and minesweeper that served in the United States Navy from 1917 to 1919.

== Acquisition and commissioning ==
Anderton was built in 1911 by Robert Palmer and Son, Noank, Groton, Connecticut, as the steam fishing trawler Raymond J. Anderton. She was purchased from her owner, T. B. Hayes, for service in World War I and delivered to the U.S. Navy on 18 June 1917. Originally she was to have been named USS Raymond J. Anderton, but she was renamed USS Anderton on 28 July 1917 prior to commissioning as required by a United States Department of the Navy general order mandating that the names of all section patrol craft be shortened to surnames only; during her Navy career, she referred to by both names as well as by the name R. J. Anderton. She was converted for naval service and commissioned at the Boston Navy Yard at Boston, Massachusetts, on 18 August 1917 as USS Anderton (SP-530).

== World War I ==
Originally assigned to the 2nd Naval District in southern New England, Anderton was reassigned during conversion to Squadron 4, Patrol Force, and ordered prepared for "distant service", and soon after commissioning got underway for France via the Azores as a unit of the 3rd Patrol Division. Arriving in France in September 1917, her division reinforced the 1st and 2nd Patrol Divisions, which had arrived earlier. Later shifted to the 12th Patrol Division, she operated off the French coast, initially assigned to coastal convoy escort duties. She and similar trawlers assigned to these duties were soon found to be unsuited to them, and after USS Rehoboth (SP-384) foundered off Ushant, France, on 4 October 1917, they were reassigned to minesweeping duties.

Anderton was one of the first four ships in her patrol division to have minesweeping gear installed. She departed Brest, France, on 3 December 1917 in company with three similar trawlers, and 6 December 1917 began minesweeping exercises in Quiberon Bay. On 13 February 1918, she became the first of the ships to catch a mine in her sweep gear, and on 21 February 1918 she and USS McNeal (SP-333) cut two mines apiece.

On 12 January 1918, USS P. K. Bauman (SP-377), while operating in a fog near Concarneau, struck a rock and began taking on water. Anderton arrived to render assistance and took Bauman under tow, but Bauman sank before the ships could arrive at Lorient.

For the remainder World War I, Anderton operated out of Lorient. Besides minesweeping duty and covering the convoy routes from Penmarch to Bouy de Boeufs, Anderton reinforced coastal convoy escorts as required, cleared the Teignouse Channel and other important passages of mines for the passage of troopships in the vicinity of Belle Île, and operated at night off Penmarch, using her primitive listening gear ("sea tubes") to detect German submarines. On 5 September 1918, when a German submarine torpedoed the transport USS Mount Vernon (ID-4508), USS Barnegat (SP-1232) and Anderton assisted Mount Vernon into Brest for repairs.

== Postwar ==
In the weeks following the end of World War I on 11 November 1918, Anderton continued minesweeping operations to make sure that shipping could travel safely in areas mined during the war. When that work was completed in the spring of 1919, Anderton departed Brest on the morning of 27 April 1919 bound for the United States in company with other U.S. Navy trawlers, but rough weather soon forced them to return to port. As Anderton did so, she towed the disabled USS Courtney (SP-375), but Courtney sank that evening about 25 minutes before the returning convoy sighted Ar Men light. A northwesterly gale made the sea very rough, and the remaining ships had to fight heavy seas, snow, and hail squalls before they reached Brest on the afternoon of 28 April 1919. Anderton remained at Brest through the summer of 1919.

== Disposal ==
Anderton was decommissioned at Brest on 8 September 1919 and put up for sale abroad. However, her prewar owners reacquired her, and she operated commercially under her original name, Raymond J. Anderton, until 1922.
