= USS Wabash =

Four ships of the United States Navy have been named USS Wabash, after the Wabash River of Indiana.

- The first USS Wabash (1855) was a screw frigate in commission from 1856 to 1874, then in use as a receiving ship until 1912.
- The second USS Wabash (ID-1824) was a civilian freighter acquired for Navy use during 1918 and 1919.
- The third USS Wabash (AOG-4) was an oiler in service from 1943 to 1957.
- The fourth USS Wabash (AOR-5) was also an oiler, in service from 1971 to 1994.
