= USS Seneca (SP-427) =

Patrol vessel of the United States Navy

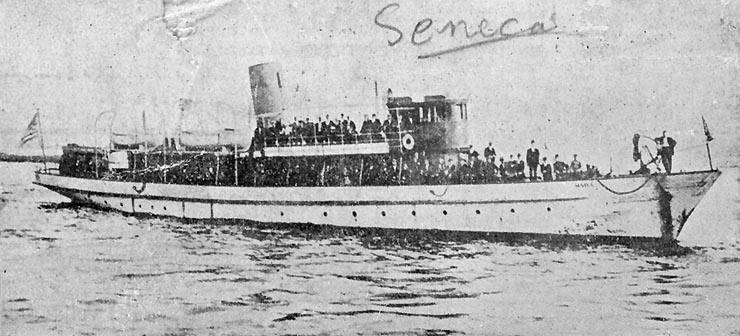
- Seneca as a civilian yacht, sometime prior to her U.S. Navy service.

History

United States
- Name: USS Seneca (1917-1918); USS SP-427 (1918-1919)
- Namesake: Seneca was her previous name retained; SP-427 was her section patrol number
- Completed: 1888
- Acquired: 7 May 1917
- Commissioned: 18 July 1917
- Decommissioned: 2 January 1919
- Stricken: 6 January 1919
- Fate: Returned to owner 6 January 1919
- Notes: Operated as civilian yacht Seneca until 1917 and from 1919

General characteristics
- Type: Minesweeper and patrol vessel
- Tonnage: 157 gross register tons
- Length: 150 ft (46 m)
- Beam: 20 ft (6.1 m)
- Draft: 10 ft 6 in (3.20 m)
- Propulsion: Steam engine
- Speed: 18 knots
- Complement: 33
- Armament: 2 × 6-pounder guns

The third USS Seneca (SP-427), later USS SP-427, was a United States Navy minesweeper and patrol vessel in commission from 1917 to 1919.

Seneca was built as a civilian steam yacht in 1888 at Boston, Massachusetts. On 7 May 1917, the U.S. Navy acquired her from her owner, the Johnson Lighterage Company, for use as a minesweeper and patrol vessel on the section patrol during World War I. She was commissioned as USS Seneca (SP-427) on 17 July 1917.

Based at Tompkinsville, Staten Island, New York, Seneca carried out minesweeping and patrol duties for the rest of World War I. In 1918, she was renamed USS SP-427.

SP-427 was decommissioned on 2 January 1919. She was stricken from the Navy List on 6 January 1919 and returned to Johnson Lighterage the same day.

Seneca (SP-427) should not be confused the barge USS Seneca (SP-1240), which was in commission at the same time.
