= Wabash Township =

Wabash Township may refer to:

== Illinois ==
- Wabash Township, Clark County, Illinois
- Wabash Precinct, Wabash County, Illinois

== Indiana ==
- Wabash Township, Adams County, Indiana
- Wabash Township, Fountain County, Indiana
- Wabash Township, Gibson County, Indiana
- Wabash Township, Jay County, Indiana
- Wabash Township, Parke County, Indiana
- Wabash Township, Tippecanoe County, Indiana

== Ohio ==
- Wabash Township, Darke County, Ohio

== See also ==
- Wabash (disambiguation)
