= Wabash Township, Parke County, Indiana =

Wabash Township
- Township
- Location in Parke County
- Coordinates: 39°43′56″N 87°20′00″W
- Country: United States
- State: Indiana
- County: Parke

Government
  - Type: Indiana township

Area
  - Total: 27.79 sq mi (72.0 km^{2})
  - Land: 27.49 sq mi (71.2 km^{2})
  - Water: 0.3 sq mi (0.78 km^{2}) 1.08%
- Elevation: 620 ft (189 m)

Population (2020)
  - Total: 768
  - Density: 27.9/sq mi (10.8/km^{2})
- Time zone: UTC-5 (Eastern (EST))
  - Summer (DST): UTC-4 (EDT)
- ZIP codes: 47860, 47862, 47872
- Area code: 765
- GNIS feature ID: 453966

Wabash Township is one of thirteen townships in Parke County, Indiana, United States. As of the 2020 census, its population was 768 and it contained 325 housing units.

Historical population
Census	Pop.	Note	%±
1890	787		—
1900	1,273		61.8%
1910	1,955		53.6%
1920	1,445		−26.1%
1930	1,559		7.9%
1940	1,338		−14.2%
1950	1,207		−9.8%
1960	970		−19.6%
1970	875		−9.8%
1980	1,028		17.5%
1990	778		−24.3%
2000	839		7.8%
2010	818		−2.5%
2020	768		−6.1%
Source: US Decennial Census

== History ==
When General William Henry Harrison took an army from Vincennes to the Battle of Tippecanoe in late 1811, Zachariah Cicott served as a scout. Cicott was familiar with the area because of his time trading up and down the Wabash River starting circa 1801. The trail taken by Harrison's army passed through the area that later became Parke County on its way to and from the battle site in Tippecanoe County. The settlement of Armiesburg was so named because Harrison and his army crossed the Raccoon Creek and camped near there on their way to the battle.

The Phillips Covered Bridge and Sim Smith Covered Bridge were listed on the National Register of Historic Places in 1978.

== Geography ==
According to the 2010 census, the township has a total area of 27.79 square miles (72.0 km^{2}), of which 27.49 square miles (71.2 km^{2}) (or 98.92%) is land and 0.3 square miles (0.78 km^{2}) (or 1.08%) is water.

=== Cities, towns, villages ===
- Mecca
- Montezuma (south edge)

=== Unincorporated towns ===
- Armiesburg at 39.763372°N 87.351128°W
- Bradfield Corner at 39.732261°N 87.298905°W

(This list is based on USGS data and may include former settlements.)

=== Cemeteries ===
The township contains these four cemeteries: Arabia, Armiesburg, Hixon and Watts.

=== Major highways ===
- U.S. Route 36
- U.S. Route 41

== School districts ==
- Southwest Parke Community School Corporation

== Political districts ==
- State House District 42
- State Senate District 23
