= Wabash Bridge (disambiguation) =

The Wabash Bridge is a railroad bridge crossing the Mississippi River near Hannibal, Missouri.

Wabash Bridge may also refer to:

- Wabash Bridge (St. Charles, Missouri), a railroad bridge crossing the Missouri River near St. Charles, Missouri
- Wabash Bridge (Pittsburgh), a former railroad bridge crossing the Monongahela River near Pittsburgh, Pennsylvania
- Wabash Bridge (Ohio River), a railroad bridge crossing the Ohio River between Mingo Junction, Ohio, and Follansbee, West Virginia
- Wabash Avenue Bridge, a road and pedestrian bridge crossing the Chicago River in Chicago, Illinois
- Wabash Memorial Bridge, a road bridge crossing the Wabash River in Posey County, Indiana
