= Montezuma, Indiana =

- Town
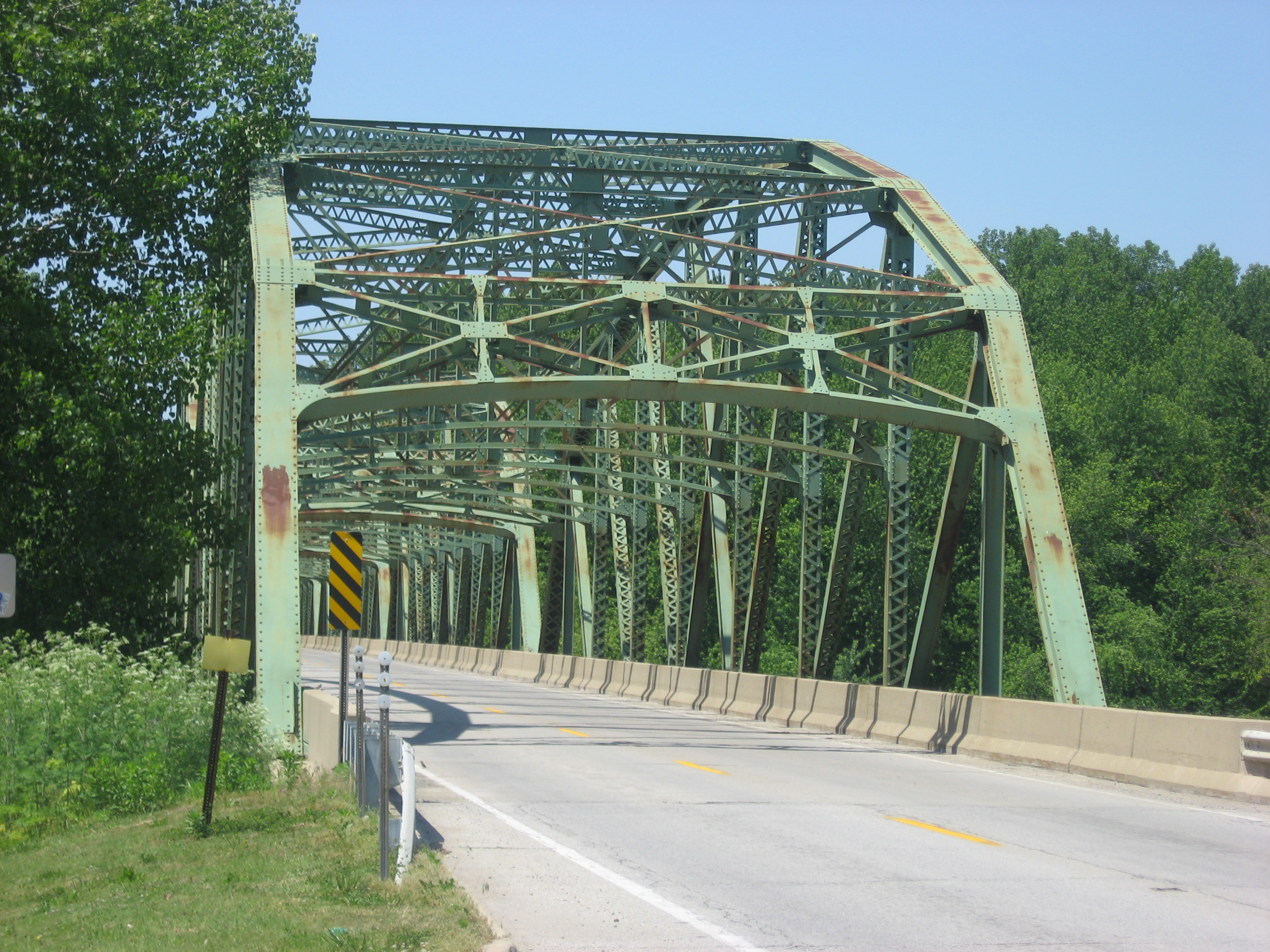
- Montezuma's U.S. Route 36 bridge over the Wabash River

- Logo

- Location of Montezuma in Parke County, Indiana.

- Detailed map of Montezuma
- Coordinates: 39°47′36″N 87°22′21″W
- Country: United States
- State: Indiana
- County: Parke
- Township: Reserve, Wabash

Area
  - Total: 0.61 sq mi (1.57 km^{2})
  - Land: 0.61 sq mi (1.57 km^{2})
  - Water: 0 sq mi (0.00 km^{2})
- Elevation: 515 ft (157 m)

Population (2020)
  - Total: 921
  - Density: 1,519.0/sq mi (586.48/km^{2})
- Time zone: UTC-5 (Eastern (EST))
  - Summer (DST): UTC-4 (EDT)
- ZIP code: 47862
- Area code: 765
- FIPS code: 18-50652
- GNIS feature ID: 2396776
- Website: www.in.gov/towns/montezuma/

Montezuma is a town in Reserve Township, Parke County, in the U.S. state of Indiana. As of the 2020 census, Montezuma had a population of 921. It is located approximately 66 miles west of the state capital Indianapolis.

== History ==
Montezuma was laid out in about 1824. The town was named for Moctezuma II, ruler of the Aztec Empire. A post office has been in operation at Montezuma since 1825.

On June 17, 2021, Montezuma experienced an earthquake that measured 3.8 on the moment magnitude scale.

== Geography ==
Montezuma lies along the Wabash River on the western border of Parke County, where U.S. Route 36 crosses the river. Most of the town is in Reserve Township, but the south edge extends into Wabash Township.

According to the 2010 census, Montezuma has a total area of 0.6 square miles (1.55 km^{2}), all land.

== Demographics ==
Historical population
Census	Pop.	Note	%±
1860	580		—
1870	624		7.6%
1880	781		25.2%
1890	658		−15.7%
1900	1,172		78.1%
1910	1,537		31.1%
1920	1,178		−23.4%
1930	1,292		9.7%
1940	1,366		5.7%
1950	1,220		−10.7%
1960	1,231		0.9%
1970	1,192		−3.2%
1980	1,352		13.4%
1990	1,134		−16.1%
2000	1,179		4.0%
2010	1,022		−13.3%
2020	921		−9.9%
U.S. Decennial Census

=== 2010 census ===
As of the census of 2010, there were 1,022 people, 417 households, and 274 families living in the town. The population density was 1,703.3 inhabitants per square mile (657.6/km^{2}). There were 514 housing units at an average density of 856.7 per square mile (330.8/km^{2}). The racial makeup of the town was 96.1% White, 0.2% African American, 0.4% Native American, 0.5% Asian, 1.6% from other races, and 1.3% from two or more races. Hispanic or Latino of any race were 4.3% of the population.

There were 417 households, of which 32.6% had children under the age of 18 living with them, 42.4% were married couples living together, 15.1% had a female householder with no husband present, 8.2% had a male householder with no wife present, and 34.3% were non-families. 28.5% of all households were made up of individuals, and 12% had someone living alone who was 65 years of age or older. The average household size was 2.45 and the average family size was 2.95.

The median age in the town was 38.5 years. 26.8% of residents were under the age of 18; 8.5% were between the ages of 18 and 24; 23.5% were from 25 to 44; 26.2% were from 45 to 64; and 15% were 65 years of age or older. The gender makeup of the town was 50.5% male and 49.5% female.

=== 2000 census ===
As of the census of 2000, there were 1,179 people, 476 households, and 343 families living in the town. The population density was 1,908.1 inhabitants per square mile (736.7/km^{2}). There were 527 housing units at an average density of 852.9 per square mile (329.3/km^{2}). The racial makeup of the town was 96.95% White, 1.95% African American, 0.17% Native American, 0.17% Asian, and 0.76% from two or more races. Hispanic or Latino of any race were 0.76% of the population.

There were 476 households, out of which 30.7% had children under the age of 18 living with them, 52.3% were married couples living together, 14.7% had a female householder with no husband present, and 27.9% were non-families. 23.1% of all households were made up of individuals, and 12.6% had someone living alone who was 65 years of age or older. The average household size was 2.46 and the average family size was 2.83.

In the town, the population was spread out, with 26.0% under the age of 18, 8.3% from 18 to 24, 25.4% from 25 to 44, 24.4% from 45 to 64, and 15.8% who were 65 years of age or older. The median age was 37 years. For every 100 females, there were 99.8 males. For every 100 females age 18 and over, there were 92.9 males.

The median income for a household in the town was $31,111, and the median income for a family was $35,313. Males had a median income of $29,803 versus $19,219 for females. The per capita income for the town was $13,754. About 16.9% of families and 20.1% of the population were below the poverty line, including 29.5% of those under age 18 and 16.0% of those age 65 or over.

== Education ==
It is in the Southwest Parke Community School Corporation.

The town has a lending library, the Montezuma Public Library.

== Notable people ==
- Gordon Allport (1897–1967), a noted personality theorist; born in Montezuma.
- James W. Hawkes (1853–1932), minister, a missionary in Qajar Iran, and a founder of a school; born in Montezuma.
