= USS Seneca (SP-1240) =

Barge of the United States Navy

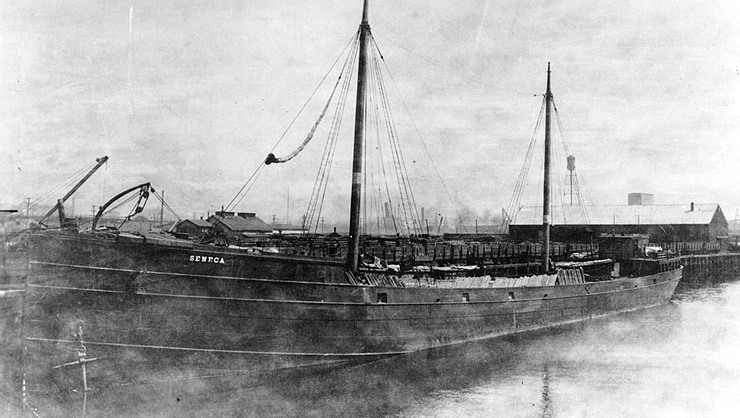
- Seneca as a commercial barge, sometime between 1884 and 1917.

History

United States
- Name: USS Seneca
- Namesake: Previous name retained
- Builder: Delaware River Iron Ship Building and Engine Works, Chester, Pennsylvania
- Completed: 1884
- Acquired: 18 October 1917
- Fate: Sold 1 October 1919
- Notes: Operated as commercial barge Seneca 1884-1917

General characteristics
- Type: Barge
- Tonnage: 2,208 gross register tons
- Length: 283 ft 7 in (86.44 m)
- Beam: 42 ft (13 m)
- Draft: 22 ft 6 in (6.86 m)
- Propulsion: None
- Sail plan: Schooner-rigged
- Armament: None

The fourth USS Seneca (SP-1240) was a United States Navy barge in commission from 1917 to 1919.

Seneca was built as a non-self-propelled commercial schooner barge of the same name in 1884 by Delaware River Iron Ship Building and Engine Works at Chester, Pennsylvania. On 18 October 1917, the U.S. Navy purchased her from the Luckenbach Steamship Company for use during World War I. Assigned the section patrol number SP-1240, she was commissioned in 1917 as USS Seneca (SP-1240).

Seneca first served as a coal barge for the Minesweeping Division at Tompkinsville, Staten Island, New York. In January 1918, she moved to Providence, Rhode Island, and she spent the last months of World War I as a floating base at Shelburne, Nova Scotia, Canada.

In February 1919, Seneca relieved the submarine tender USS Bushnell (AS-2) as temporary tender for Submarine Division 5, and served as such, primarily as an accommodation ship, at Philadelphia, Pennsylvania, from 4 March to 28 May 1919 and at Norfolk, Virginia, from 29 May 1919 until detached on 29 August 1919.

Seneca was ordered sold on 10 September 1919 and was delivered to her purchaser, the Neptune Line of New York City, on 1 October 1919.

Seneca should not be confused with the minesweeper and patrol vessel USS Seneca (SP-427), which was in commission at the same time.
