= Wabash Avenue =

Wabash Avenue may refer to:

- Wabash Avenue (film)
- Wabash Avenue (Baltimore)
- Wabash Avenue Bridge, Chicago
- Wabash Avenue YMCA, Chicago
