= Wabash, West Virginia =

Coordinates: 39.3278788°N 79.1817027°W

Wabash is a ghost town in Mineral County, in the U.S. state of West Virginia.

== History ==
A post office called Wabash was established in 1904, and remained in operation until 1913. The community took its name from the Wabash Railroad.
