= Wabash Trail =

Wabash Trail may refer to:

- Trails following the old Wabash Railroad line.

- Wabash Trail (Sangamon County), Illinois
- Wabash Heritage Trail, Indiana
- Wabash Cannonball Trail, Ohio

== See also ==
- Wabash Trace, a rail trail in Iowa
