= Wabash Avenue Bridge =

Bridge in Chicago, Illinois, U.S.

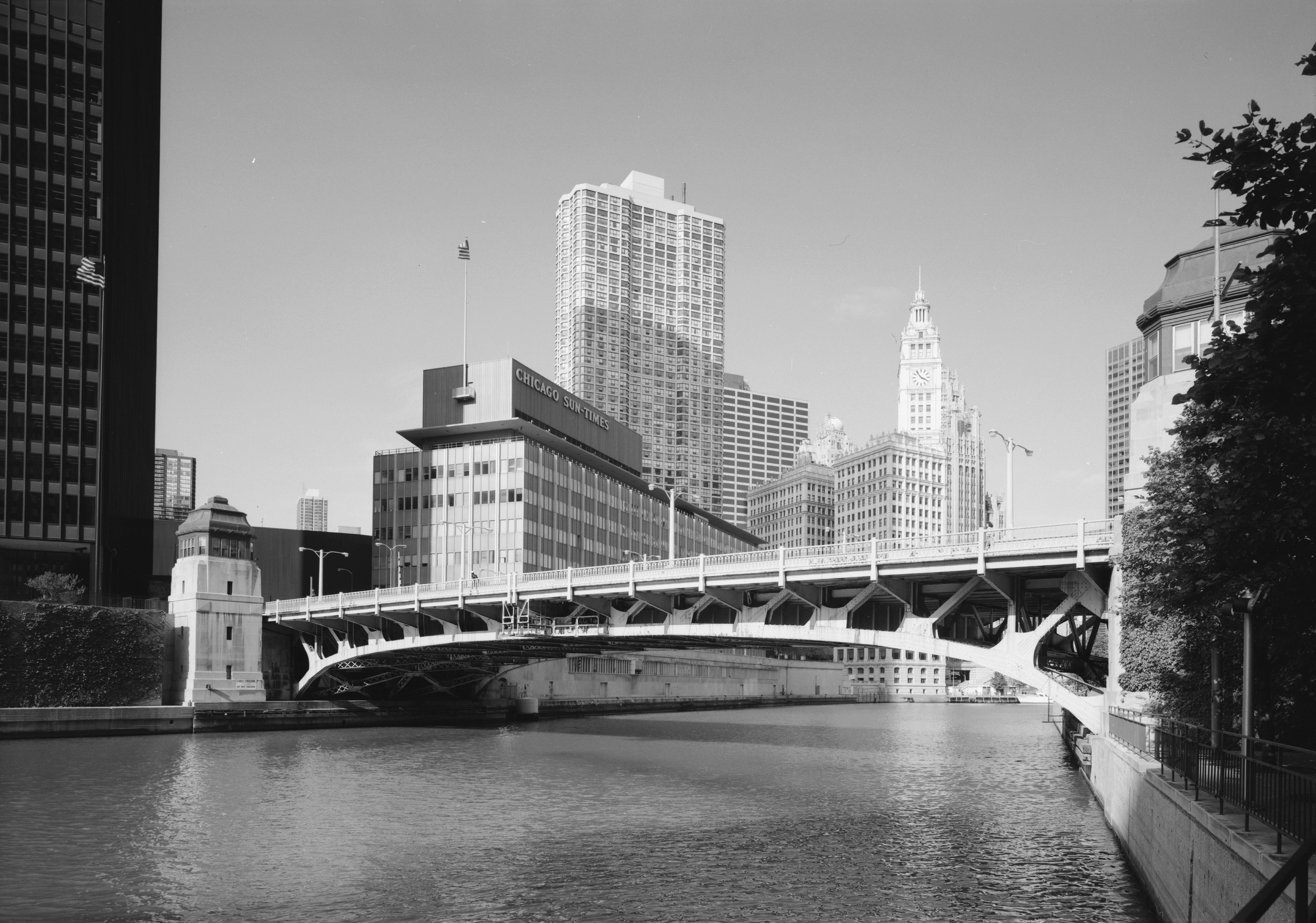
- The bridge in 1999
- Coordinates: 41.887924°N 87.626839°W
- Carries: Automobiles; Pedestrians
- Crosses: Chicago River
- Locale: Chicago, Cook County, Illinois
- Official name: Irv Kupcinet Bridge
- Other name: Wabash Avenue Bridge
- Maintained by: Chicago Department of Transportation
- ID number: 000016605226647

Characteristics
- Design: Double-leaf bascule bridge
- Total length: 345 feet (105 m)
- Width: 90 feet (27 m)
- Longest span: 232 feet (71 m)
- No. of spans: 3
- Clearance below: 22 feet (7 m)

History
- Designer: Thomas Pihlfeldt
- Opened: 1930

Statistics
- Daily traffic: 5,800

Location
- Interactive map of Wabash Avenue Bridge

The Wabash Avenue Bridge (officially, Irv Kupcinet Bridge) over the Chicago River was built in 1930. Standing west of the Michigan Avenue Bridge and east of Marina City, the bascule bridge connects the Near North Side with "The Loop" area.

== History ==
In the late 1920s, the bridge was added as another entry into the Loop to relieve congestion on the Michigan Avenue and State Street bridges. Because it connected Wabash Avenue to then-Cass Avenue on a skew and had to preserve a wide navigation channel, it was built with a 232-foot clear span, then the longest for a Chicago River bridge.

The single-deck, double-leaf bascule bridge was designed by Thomas Pihlfeldt and built by the Ketler and Elliot Company. The American Institute of Steel Construction awarded it the "Most Beautiful" bridge in 1930.

The control houses for controlling bridge operations are on the northwest and southwest corners of the bridge. The control houses are identical in design. In 1961 the control houses were upgraded to allow single man operation. Electrical modernization also accompanied this upgrade. While the northern control house is no longer in use, it still stands.

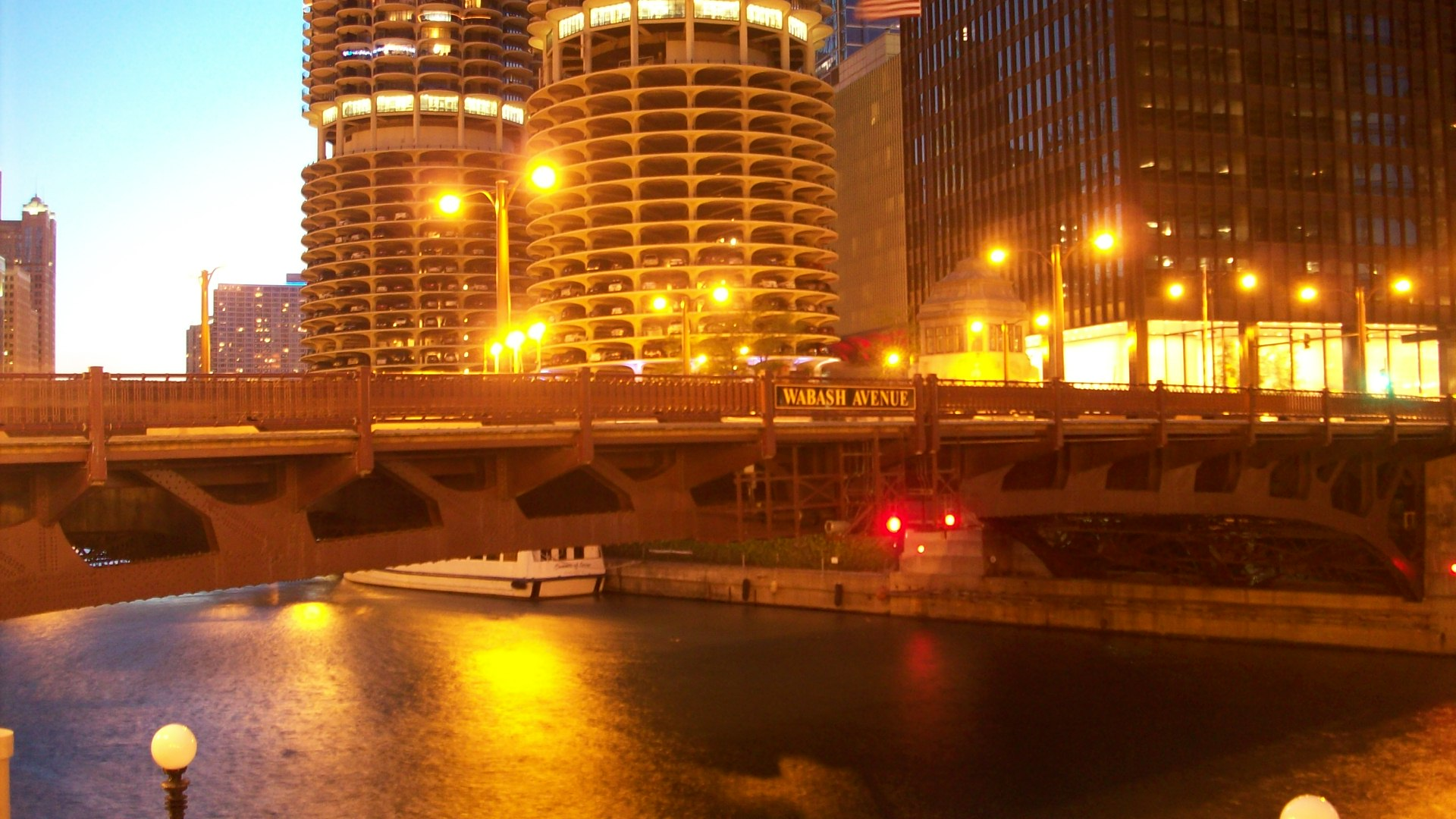
Wabash Avenue Bridge at night

== See also ==
- List of bridges documented by the Historic American Engineering Record in Illinois
