= Battle of the Wabash =

The Battle of the Wabash was a battle fought in 1791 during the Northwest Indian War.

Battle of the Wabash may also refer to several battles that took place around the Wabash River including:

- Battle of Vincennes (1779)
- Harmar's Defeat (1790)
- Battle of Fort Recovery (1794)
- Battle of Tippecanoe (1811)
- Siege of Fort Harrison (1812)
- Siege of Fort Wayne (1812)
