= Wabash, Ohio =

Unincorporated community in Ohio, U.S.

Coordinates: 40°32′44″N 84°45′00″W

Wabash is an unincorporated community in Mercer County, in the U.S. state of Ohio.

== History ==
A post office called Wabash was established in 1881, and remained in operation until 1904. Besides the post office, Wabash had a church, country store, and school.
