= Chicago, Attica and Southern Railroad =

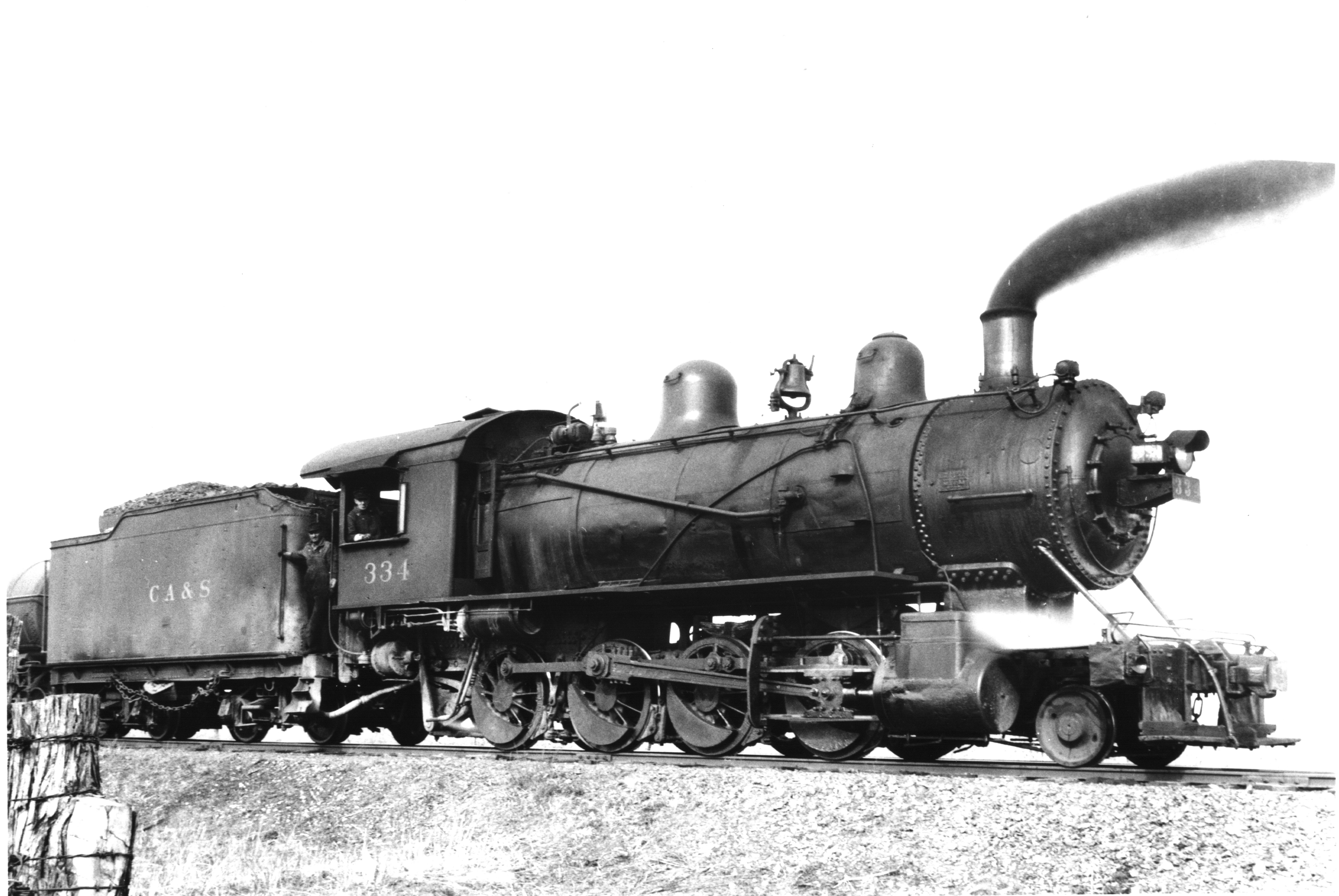
- CA&S engine 334 in 1931

Overview
- Headquarters: Attica, Indiana
- Reporting mark: CAS
- Locale: Northwestern and west central Indiana
- Dates of operation: 1922–1946
- Predecessor: Chicago and Eastern Illinois Railway

The Chicago, Attica and Southern Railroad (reporting mark CAS), nicknamed the "Dolly Varden Line", was a railroad linking small towns in west central and northwestern Indiana to the Chicago and Eastern Illinois Railway (C&EI) near Momence, Illinois (where traffic continued to Chicago). Never financially strong, the CA&S nevertheless continued operating through World War II before abandonment.

== History ==
In the 1880s, the Chicago and Great Southern Railway (C&GS) completed a rail line from the Indiana community of Fair Oaks (where it joined the Monon Railroad) south to the city of Brazil. Primarily a coal hauler, the C&GS later reorganized as the Chicago and Indiana Coal Railway (C&IC) and extended the line further north to La Crosse and Wilders to form connections with other railroads.

The management of the C&IC "Coal Road" became intertwined with that of the Chicago and Eastern Illinois, and a connection was built between the two that ran from Percy Junction north of Goodland (on the C&IC) northwest to Momence, Illinois (on the C&EI). By 1894, the Chicago and Eastern Illinois had absorbed the smaller C&IC.

In 1913, the C&EI went bankrupt. As part of its reorganization over the next several years, it cut free the old "Coal Road", which in turn organized itself into the Chicago, Attica and Southern Railroad, selling to other railroads some of its more valuable lines for cash. The CA&S struggled through the 1920s and found itself bankrupt in 1931. It never left receivership or turned a profit again and began to abandon its track in increments over the next fifteen years. The CA&S abandoned its connection to the C&EI in 1943, shut down operations in September 1946, and was completely abandoned shortly thereafter.

== Communities ==
At its height, the Chicago, Attica and Southern served the following communities, from north to south:

- Momence, Illinois
- Pogue
- Morocco
- Beaver City
- Brook
- Goodland
- Wadena
- Swanington
- Oxford
- Pine Village
- Winthrop
- Kickapoo
- Attica
- Rob Roy
- Aylesworth
- Stone Bluff
- Veedersburg
- Steam Corner
- Kingman
- Tangier
- Sylvania
- West Union
- Mecca Mills
- Coxville
- Rosedale
- Coal Bluff
- Brazil

== Gallery ==
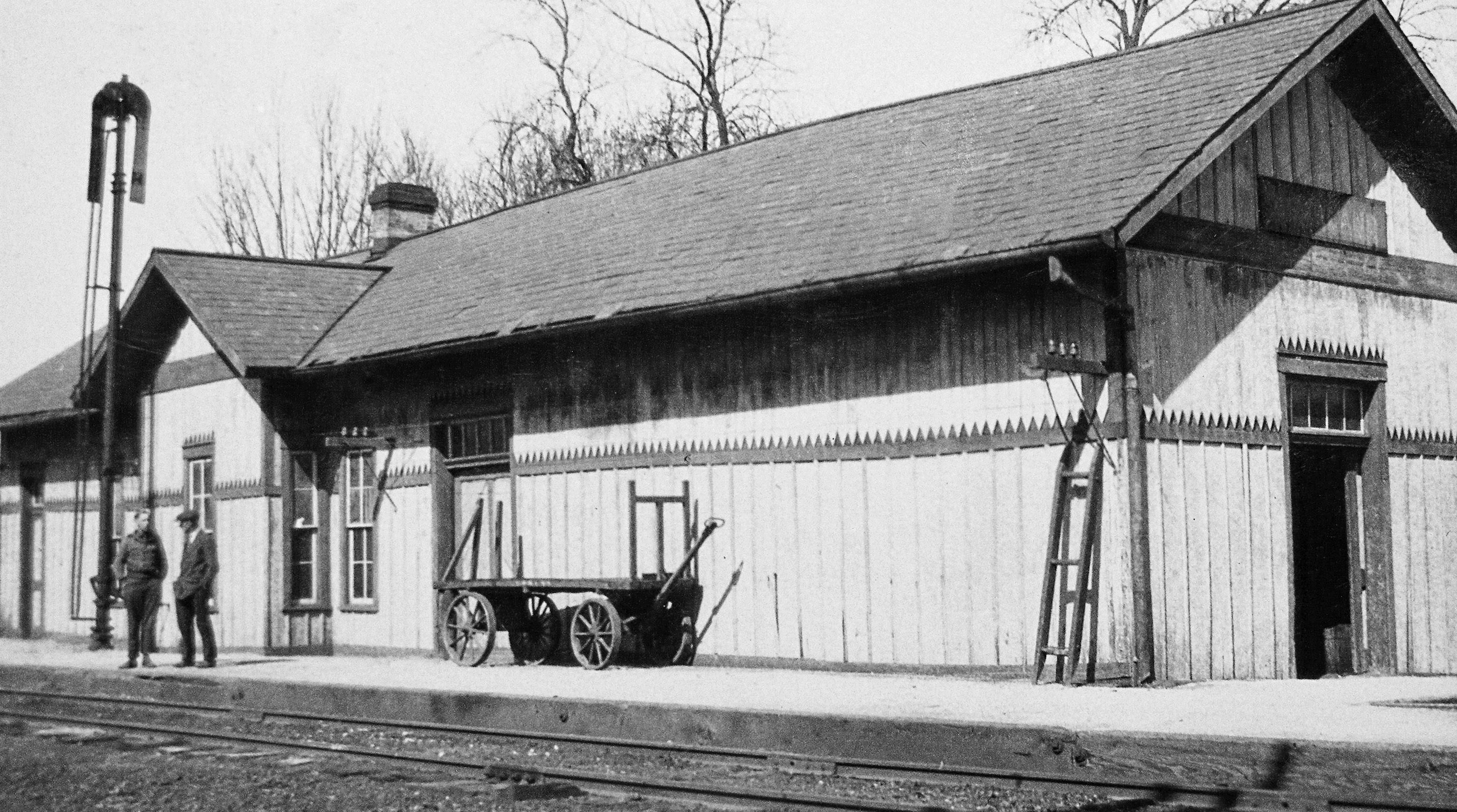
Goodland, Indiana, CA&S Depot
