= Snoddy's Mill =

- Location in Fountain County Location in Indiana Location in United States
- 40.030°N 87.376°W

History
- Built: 1828

Site notes
- Area: 12 acres (4.9 ha)
- Governing body: Private

Snoddy's Mill was a historic grist mill located at Wabash Township, Fountain County, Indiana, United States.

== History ==
In 1828, Benjamin Beckelhymer and Isaac Ferguson built a sawmill over Coal Creek. A mill for lumber was an important addition to life in early Fountain County. As the growing population's need for ground corn increased, the mill partners soon added a grist mill. Together, Beckelhymer and Ferguson operated these mills for about ten years. Beckelhymer and Ferguson sold the mill to John A. Kiger, who sold the mill to John Headley.

Headley's Mills operated until 1851 when it was purchased by partners Samuel I. Snoddy and John Hardisty. These partners sold out to George Mosier in 1854. The next year, 1855, Samuel Snoddy bought the mill along with twelve acres of adjoining property. In 1863, he expanded the site by 160 acres.

As postmaster, Snoddy changed the name of Headley's Mills to "Snoddy's Mills" in October 1864. As he observed the business potential provided by the expanding coal mining community in nearby Stringtown, Snoddy reworked the grist mill in 1869 by adding three runs of burrs for producing flour. By 1872, a railroad was constructed as an effective outlet for the nearby coal industry which had been shipping over the Wabash and Erie Canal. Within two years, Snoddy's enterprises expanded to his first general store. By 1877, he opened his second store, so that one was a grocery and the other a dry goods store. In 1888, Snoddy turned the enterprise over to two of his sons.

When the local coal mining business faded away, Snoddy's Mills continued to stand. The post office name was changed to "Coal Creek" in July 1888. The log dam was replaced by a concrete dam. The mill operated until as late as 1946. The creek below the dam became a beach for swimmers. Nearby Stringtown Road was rerouted in 1965 so that traffic no longer passed directly over Coal Creek at Snoddy's Mill. In 1966, the mill building was restored by the local historical society to serve as a museum. However, the building was eventually abandoned and was razed in 1982. The concrete dam remains.
