= Steam Corner, Indiana =

- Unincorporated community
- Fountain County's location in Indiana

- Steam Corner's location in Fountain County
- Coordinates: 40°02′34″N 87°14′36″W
- Country: United States
- State: Indiana
- County: Fountain
- Township: Millcreek
- Elevation: 682 ft (208 m)
- ZIP code: 47987 (Veedersburg)
- Area code: 765
- FIPS code: 18-72836
- GNIS feature ID: 444103

Steam Corner is a small unincorporated settlement in Millcreek Township, Fountain County, Indiana.

== History ==
A post office was established at Steam Corner in 1851, and remained in operation until it was discontinued in 1904. Steam Mill was named from the presence of a steam-powered mill.

In the 1880s the Chicago and Great Southern Railway completed a north–south rail line through Fountain County which ran from Clay and Vigo counties in the south to Newton County and Kankakee County, Illinois in the north. Steam Corner, also known as Long Siding Station, became a stop along this railroad between stations at Veedersburg and Yeddo. The rail line was later operated by the Chicago and Eastern Illinois Railroad and ultimately the Chicago, Attica and Southern Railroad, which ran the line until its closure in the 1940s.

== Geography ==
Steam Corner is located at the intersection of U.S. Route 41 and State Road 32 in Mill Creek Township, about five miles south of Veedersburg. Prairie Creek begins northeast of Steam Corner and flows west to Coal Creek near the Wabash River.
