= Lake Holiday Hideaway, Indiana =

- Census-designated place
- Location within Indiana Location within the United States
- Coordinates: 40°59′56″N 87°18′21″W
- Country: United States
- State: Indiana
- County: Fountain
- Township: Millcreek

Area
  - Total: 0.63 sq mi (1.6 km^{2})
  - Land: 0.53 sq mi (1.4 km^{2})
  - Water: 0.10 sq mi (0.26 km^{2})
- Elevation: 630 ft (190 m)
- Time zone: UTC-5 (Eastern (EST))
  - Summer (DST): UTC-4 (EDT)
- ZIP code: 47952 (Kingman)
- Area code: 765
- FIPS code: 18-41215
- GNIS feature ID: 2830372

Lake Holiday Hideaway is an unincorporated community and census-designated place (CDP) in Fountain County, Indiana, United States.

== Geography ==
The community is in southern Fountain County, built around a reservoir named "Lake Holiday Hide-away" built on Mill Creek. The town of Kingman is 2 miles (3 km) to the southeast, while Veedersburg is 10 miles (16 km) to the north.

According to the United States Census Bureau, the CDP has a total area of 0.63 square miles (1.63 km^{2}), of which 0.53 square miles (1.37 km^{2}) are land and 0.10 square miles (0.26 km^{2}), or 15.37%, are water. Via Mill Creek, the lake drains southwest to the Wabash River.

== Demographics ==
The United States Census Bureau delineated Lake Holiday Hideaway as a census designated place in the 2022 American Community Survey.
