= Stringtown, Fountain County, Indiana =

Stringtown
- Extinct town
- Location within Indiana
- Coordinates: 40°02′29″N 87°22′50″W
- Country: United States
- State: Indiana
- County: Fountain
- Township: Wabash
- Elevation: 640 ft (200 m)
- ZIP code: 47932

Stringtown, or String Town, was a small mining settlement near Snoddy's Mill (now Coal Creek) in Wabash Township, Fountain County, Indiana in the United States. It is part of a collection of (though unrelated) communities named Stringtown. An 1881 history of the county offers the following brief description:

"String Town" is a mining place close to Snoddy's mill. It is a collection of cheap houses mostly erected by the coal companies to be used by the miners. It is of mushroom growth, and an immense business is done, especially in liquors, there being about seventeen saloons at this point. It is hoped that the better element will become stronger, and that at some time this intemperance will cease. There are about 600 men employed in the mines, and the demand for coal is far beyond the ability to supply on account of the scarcity of conveyance. There are religious organizations here, but mostly composed of foreigners engaged in mining.

== Geography ==
Stringtown is located at 40°02′29″N 87°22′50″W.
