= Cates, Indiana =

- Unincorporated community and Census-designated place
- Fountain County's location in Indiana

- Location in Fountain County
- Coordinates: 39°59′56″N 87°20′12″W
- Country: United States
- State: Indiana
- County: Fountain
- Township: Fulton
- Elevation: 640 ft (200 m)
- ZIP code: 47952
- FIPS code: 18-10900
- GNIS feature ID: 2830371

Cates is an unincorporated community in Fulton Township, Fountain County, Indiana, United States. Estimated population is 125.

== History ==
A post office was established at Cates in 1883, and remained in operation until it was discontinued in 1984. Cates was platted in 1903.

== Geography ==
Cates is located between Kingman and Perrysville.

== Demographics ==
The United States Census Bureau delineated Cates as a census designated place in the 2022 American Community Survey.
