= Clinton F. Hesler Farm =

- U.S. National Register of Historic Places
- U.S. Historic district
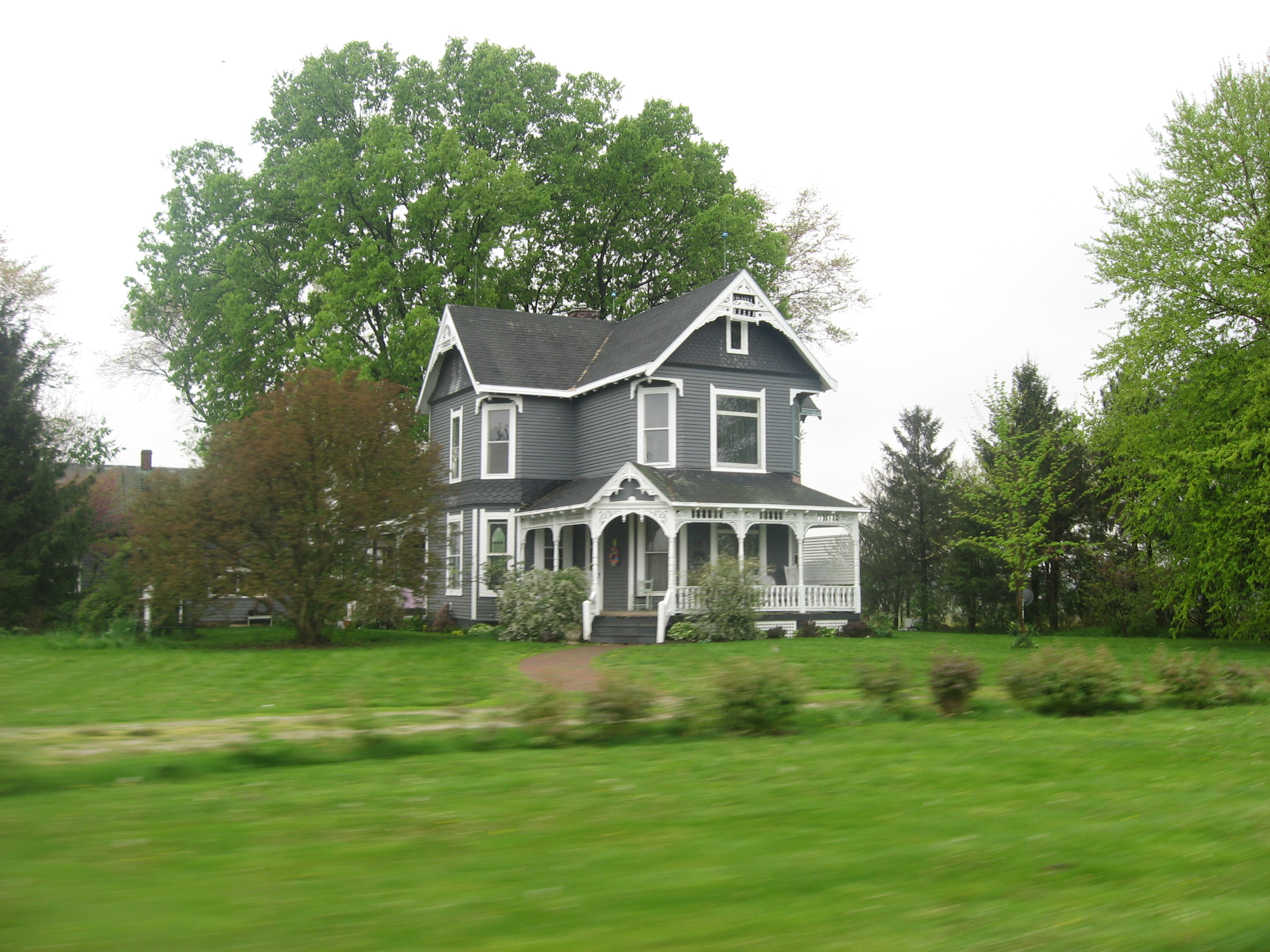
- Clinton F. Hesler Farmhouse, April 2012

- Location within Fountain County, Indiana Location within Indiana Location within the United States
- Location: County Road 450S between 200E and 300E, southeast of Veedersburg, Millcreek Township, Fountain County, Indiana
- Coordinates: 40°3′39″N 87°12′56″W
- Area: 3.5 acres (1.4 ha)
- Built: 1887
- Architectural style: Queen Anne, Transverse-frame barn
- NRHP reference No.: 89000770
- Added to NRHP: July 13, 1989

Clinton F. Hesler Farm, also known as Clearview Farm, is a historic home and farm and national historic district located at Millcreek Township, Fountain County, Indiana. The farmhouse was built in 1896, and is a two-story, "T"-plan, Queen Anne style balloon frame dwelling. It features steep gable roofs, a wraparound porch, fishscale shingles, and elaborate millwork. Also on the property are the contributing horse barn (1887), cattle barn (c. 1910), corn crib (c. 1910), summerhouse (1896), and cast-iron fence (1896).

It was listed on the National Register of Historic Places in 1989.
