= Fulton Township, Fountain County, Indiana =

Fulton Township
- Township
- Location of Fulton Township in Fountain County
- Coordinates: 39°59′05″N 87°22′17″W
- Country: United States
- State: Indiana
- County: Fountain

Government
  - Type: Indiana township

Area
  - Total: 30.63 sq mi (79.32 km^{2})
  - Land: 30.3 sq mi (78.6 km^{2})
  - Water: 0.28 sq mi (0.72 km^{2})
- Elevation: 590 ft (180 m)

Population (2020)
  - Total: 606
  - Density: 20.0/sq mi (7.71/km^{2})
- FIPS code: 18-26134
- GNIS feature ID: 453321

Fulton Township is one of eleven townships in Fountain County, Indiana, United States. As of the 2020 census, its population was 606.

Historical population
Census	Pop.	Note	%±
1890	1,255		—
1900	1,330		6.0%
1910	1,105		−16.9%
1920	980		−11.3%
1930	960		−2.0%
1940	891		−7.2%
1950	835		−6.3%
1960	765		−8.4%
1970	705		−7.8%
1980	731		3.7%
1990	725		−0.8%
2000	674		−7.0%
2010	622		−7.7%
2020	606		−2.6%
Source: US Decennial Census

== Geography ==
Fulton Township covers an area of 30.63 square miles (79.3 km^{2}); 0.28 square miles (0.73 km^{2}) (0.91 percent) of this is water. It contains two unincorporated settlements: Cates, in the eastern part of the township, and Silverwood in the southwest, just north of Lodi in Parke County. Indiana State Road 234 passes through Silverwood on its way east from Cayuga in neighboring Vermillion County.

Map of Fulton Township

=== Cemeteries ===
The township contains these six cemeteries: Baker, Bethel, Cates, Hibbs, Norton and Silver Island.

== School districts ==
- Covington Community School Corporation

== Political districts ==
- Indiana's 8th congressional district
- State House District 42
- State Senate District 23
