= Lindley H. Hadley =

American politician (1861–1948)

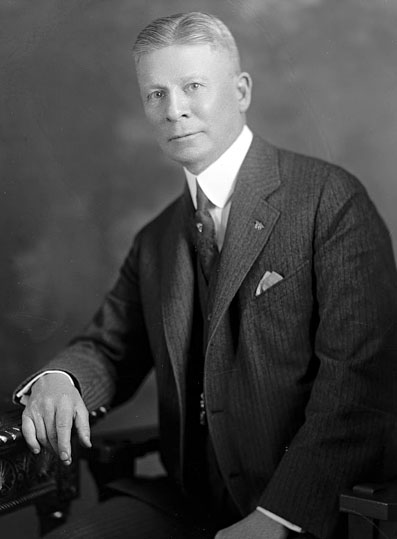

Member of the U.S. House of Representatives from Washington's 2nd district
- In office March 4, 1915 – March 3, 1933
- Preceded by: Albert Johnson
- Succeeded by: Monrad Wallgren

Personal details
- Born: June 19, 1861 Sylvania, Indiana, U.S.
- Died: November 1, 1948 (aged 87) Wallingford, Connecticut, U.S.
- Party: Republican

Lindley Hoag Hadley (June 19, 1861 – November 1, 1948) was a U.S. representative from Washington.

== Biography ==
Born near Sylvania, Indiana, Hadley attended the common schools of his native city, Bloomingdale (Indiana) Academy, and Illinois Wesleyan University, Bloomington, Illinois. He taught school in Rockville, Indiana from 1884 to 1889. He studied law. He was admitted to the bar in 1889. He moved to the State of Washington in 1890 and settled in Whatcom (now Bellingham), where he practiced law until elected to Congress.

Hadley was elected as a Republican to the Sixty-fourth and to the eight succeeding Congresses (March 4, 1915 – March 3, 1933). He was an unsuccessful candidate for reelection in 1932 to the Seventy-third Congress. Reengaged in the practice of law in Washington, D.C., until 1940, when he retired from active life and moved to Wilton, Connecticut. He died in Wallingford, Connecticut, November 1, 1948. He was interred in St. Matthew's Cemetery, Wilton, Connecticut.

== Sources ==
- United States Congress. "Lindley H. Hadley (id: H000008)". Biographical Directory of the United States Congress.

U.S. House of Representatives
Preceded by Albert Johnson	Member of the U.S. House of Representatives from Washington's 2nd congressional district 1915-1933	Succeeded by Monrad Wallgren
