= Marshall Bridge =

Marshall Bridge may refer to:

- Marshall Covered Bridge, Rockville, Indiana, also known as Marshall Bridge, listed on the National Register of Historic Places in Parke County, Indiana
- Marshall Bridge (Marshall, Washington), listed on the National Register of Historic Places in Spokane County, Washington
