= Harveysburg, Indiana =

- Unincorporated community
- Fountain County's location in Indiana

- Harveysburg's location in Fountain County
- Coordinates: 39°58′56″N 87°17′41″W
- Country: United States
- State: Indiana
- County: Fountain
- Township: Millcreek
- Elevation: 676 ft (206 m)
- ZIP code: 47952
- FIPS code: 18-32386
- GNIS feature ID: 435855

Harveysburg is an unincorporated community in Millcreek Township, Fountain County, Indiana, United States.

== History ==
A post office was established at Harveysburg in 1857 and remained in operation until it was discontinued in 1900. It was named for Harlan Harvey, an early settler.
