= Silverwood, Indiana =

- Unincorporated community
- Fountain County's location in Indiana

- Silverwood's location in Fountain County
- Coordinates: 39°57′20″N 87°24′12″W
- Country: United States
- State: Indiana
- County: Fountain
- Township: Fulton
- Elevation: 525 ft (160 m)
- ZIP code: 47952
- FIPS code: 18-69822
- GNIS feature ID: 443517

Silverwood is an unincorporated community in Fulton Township, Fountain County, Indiana.

== History ==
Silverwood was founded in 1881. The Silverwood post office closed in 1933.

== Geography ==
Silverwood is located adjacent to the town of Lodi.
