= Fountain, Indiana =

- Unincorporated community
- Fountain County's location in Indiana

- Fountain's location in Fountain County
- Coordinates: 40°13′20″N 87°20′07″W
- Country: United States
- State: Indiana
- County: Fountain
- Township: Shawnee
- Elevation: 551 ft (168 m)
- ZIP code: 47932
- GNIS feature ID: 434710

Fountain (originally named Portland) is an unincorporated community in Shawnee Township, Fountain County, Indiana, United States. The Wabash and Erie Canal formerly passed through the community.

== History ==
Portland was laid out in April 1828 by surveyor William Miller, Barnard Preble and Major Whitlocke. Keep's store, an early trading point at Portland, supplied goods to people along a lengthy stretch of the Wabash River. Sandford C. Cox in Personal Recollections of Early Settlements writes that "powder, lead, salt, iron, whiskey and leather were the staples of the trade in those days, and were exchanged for the productions of the country, such as beeswax, tallow, feathers, ginseng, furs, deer-skins, wild hops, etc." Portland grew to include 11 stores, a hotel, six physicians, various craftsmen and a "considerable population."

The post office Fountain once contained was called Portland from 1828 until 1868. The post office operated under the new name of Fountain from 1868 until it was discontinued in 1905.

== Geography ==
Fountain is located on the southeastern banks of the Wabash River, at an elevation of approximately 560 feet. To the south is Bear Creek, which joins the Wabash on the western edge of town, and the wooded Portland Arch Nature Preserve.
