= Centennial, Indiana =

- Unincorporated community
- Fountain County's location in Indiana

- Location in Fountain County
- Coordinates: 40°00′41″N 87°14′36″W
- Country: United States
- State: Indiana
- County: Fountain
- Township: Millcreek
- Elevation: 692 ft (211 m)
- ZIP code: 47952
- FIPS code: 18-11206
- GNIS feature ID: 452114

Centennial is an unincorporated community in Millcreek Township, Fountain County, Indiana, United States.

Centennial was the name of a church in Mill Creek Township, that was so named from it being established on the centenary of its denomination.
