= Liberty Township, Parke County, Indiana =

Liberty Township
- Township
- Location in Parke County
- Coordinates: 39°54′46″N 87°19′59″W
- Country: United States
- State: Indiana
- County: Parke

Government
  - Type: Indiana township

Area
  - Total: 39.29 sq mi (101.8 km^{2})
  - Land: 38.92 sq mi (100.8 km^{2})
  - Water: 0.37 sq mi (0.96 km^{2}) 0.94%
- Elevation: 636 ft (194 m)

Population (2020)
  - Total: 598
  - Density: 15.4/sq mi (5.93/km^{2})
- Time zone: UTC-5 (Eastern (EST))
  - Summer (DST): UTC-4 (EDT)
- ZIP codes: 47832, 47862, 47952
- Area code: 765
- GNIS feature ID: 453558

Liberty Township is one of thirteen townships in Parke County, Indiana, United States. As of the 2020 census, its population was 598 and it contained 296 housing units.

Historical population
Census	Pop.	Note	%±
1890	1,814		—
1900	1,895		4.5%
1910	1,513		−20.2%
1920	1,376		−9.1%
1930	1,090		−20.8%
1940	1,223		12.2%
1950	1,023		−16.4%
1960	921		−10.0%
1970	852		−7.5%
1980	889		4.3%
1990	719		−19.1%
2000	768		6.8%
2010	739		−3.8%
2020	598		−19.1%
Source: US Decennial Census

== History ==
The W.H. York Round Barn, Bowsher Ford Covered Bridge, Marshall Covered Bridge, Mill Creek Covered Bridge, and Rush Creek Covered Bridge are listed on the National Register of Historic Places.

== Geography ==
According to the 2010 census, the township has a total area of 39.29 square miles (101.8 km^{2}), of which 38.92 square miles (100.8 km^{2}) (or 99.06%) is land and 0.37 square miles (0.96 km^{2}) (or 0.94%) is water.

=== Unincorporated towns ===
- Howard at 39.91615°N 87.375570°W
- Lodi at 39.950039°N 87.405848°W
- Sylvania at 39.918929°N 87.294457°W
- Tangier at 39.919206°N 87.318069°W

(This list is based on USGS data and may include former settlements.)

=== Cemeteries ===
The township contains these seven cemeteries: Brockway, Ephlin, Harvey, Miller, Rush Creek, Russell and Shirk.

== School districts ==
- North Central Parke Community School Corporation
- Formerly: Turkey Run Community School Corporation

== Political districts ==
- State House District 42
- State Senate District 38
