= Howard, Indiana =

Unincorporated community in Indiana, United States

- Unincorporated community
- Parke County's location in Indiana

- Location in Parke County
- Coordinates: 39°54′58″N 87°22′32″W
- Country: United States
- State: Indiana
- County: Parke
- Township: Liberty
- Elevation: 554 ft (169 m)
- Time zone: UTC-5 (Eastern (EST))
  - Summer (DST): UTC-4 (EDT)
- ZIP code: 47859
- Area code: 765
- GNIS feature ID: 432532

Howard, also known as Burton or Westport, is an unincorporated community in Liberty Township, Parke County, in the U.S. state of Indiana.

== History ==
Howard was named after Tilghman Howard, a U.S. Representative from Indiana.

== Geography ==
Howard is located at 39°54′54″N 87°22′26″W at an elevation of 554 feet.
