= Van Buren Township, Fountain County, Indiana =

Van Buren Township
- Township
- Location of Van Buren Township in Fountain County
- Coordinates: 40°07′48″N 87°15′16″W
- Country: United States
- State: Indiana
- County: Fountain

Government
  - Type: Indiana township

Area
  - Total: 37.52 sq mi (97.2 km^{2})
  - Land: 37.48 sq mi (97.1 km^{2})
  - Water: 0.03 sq mi (0.078 km^{2})
- Elevation: 587 ft (179 m)

Population (2020)
  - Total: 2,919
  - Density: 77.88/sq mi (30.07/km^{2})
- FIPS code: 18-78452
- GNIS feature ID: 453945

Van Buren Township is one of eleven townships in Fountain County, Indiana. As of the 2020 census, its population was 2,919 and it contained 1,306 housing units.

Historical population
Census	Pop.	Note	%±
1890	2,492		—
1900	3,271		31.3%
1910	3,241		−0.9%
1920	2,930		−9.6%
1930	2,890		−1.4%
1940	3,103		7.4%
1950	3,031		−2.3%
1960	3,074		1.4%
1970	3,004		−2.3%
1980	3,266		8.7%
1990	3,081		−5.7%
2000	3,121		1.3%
2010	2,972		−4.8%
2020	2,919		−1.8%
Source: US Decennial Census

== Geography ==
According to the 2010 census, the township has a total area of 37.52 square miles (97.2 km^{2}), of which 37.48 square miles (97.1 km^{2}) (or 99.89%) is land and 0.03 square miles (0.078 km^{2}) (or 0.08%) is water.

Map of Van Buren Township

=== Cities and towns ===
- Veedersburg

=== Unincorporated towns ===
- Harrison Lake
- Hunter Corner
- Simpson Corner
- Stone Bluff

(This list is based on USGS data and may include former settlements.)

=== Major highways ===
- Interstate 74
- U.S. Route 41
- U.S. Route 136

=== Cemeteries ===
The township contains three cemeteries: Bonebrake, Cold Springs and Rock Field.
