= Portland Arch Nature Preserve =

Nature preserve in Indiana, United States

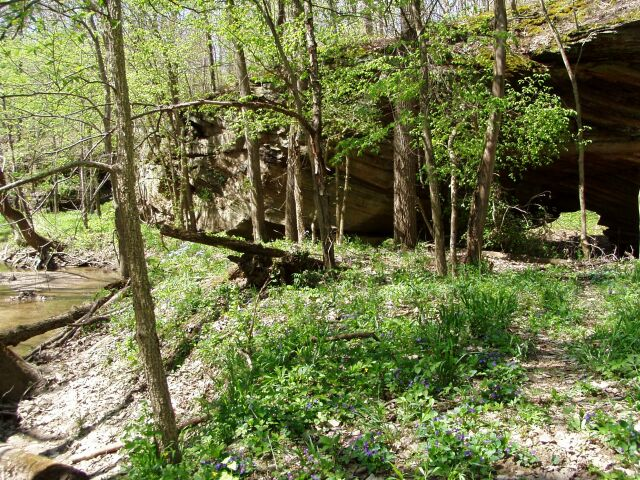
- Portland Arch from the south

- Location within Indiana
- Location: Fountain County, Indiana
- Nearest city: Fountain
- Coordinates: 40°13′07″N 87°20′09″W
- Area: 435 acres (1.76 km^{2})
- Governing body: Indiana Department of Natural Resources

U.S. National Natural Landmark
- Designated: 1973

Portland Arch Nature Preserve is a 435-acre (1.76 km^{2}) nature preserve near the Wabash River in Fountain County, Indiana, US, and is a National Natural Landmark. The preserve encompasses the wooded valleys, ravines and rocky cliffs around the lowest section of Bear Creek, which flows northwest toward the Wabash River. Its name comes from the nearby town of Fountain, which was originally named Portland, and from a natural sandstone bridge carved by a small tributary of Bear Creek.

Portland Arch Nature Preserve is managed by the Indiana Department of Natural Resources.

== Geology ==
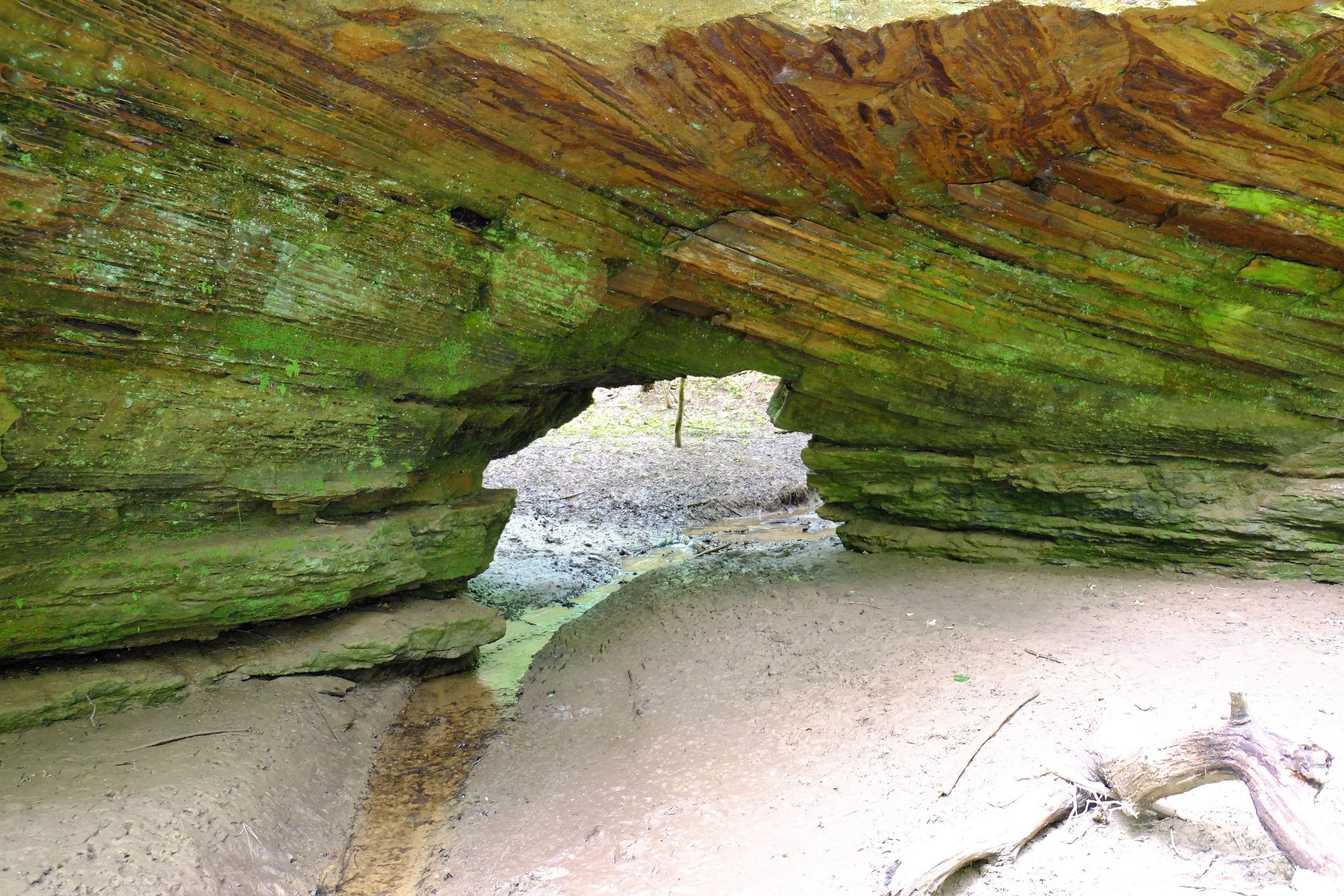
Portland Arch inside the Nature Preserve Park

Portland Arch is one of only a few natural arches in Indiana. The arch was created through the Mansfield Sandstone by Bear Creek, undercutting the bluff on both sides. The sandstone was strong enough that it did not collapse. The Mansfield Sandstone is from the Pennsylvanian Period, some 230 million years ago. The cross stratification of the layers were formed in s shallow bottomed lake where it drops into deeper water. The slope reflects the change from the shallows into deeper water. Arches like this were used as rock shelters by Native Americans and early pioneers. Along the valley escarpment, talus rocks have fallen into the valley.
