= Fred S. Purnell =

American politician

Fred Purnell
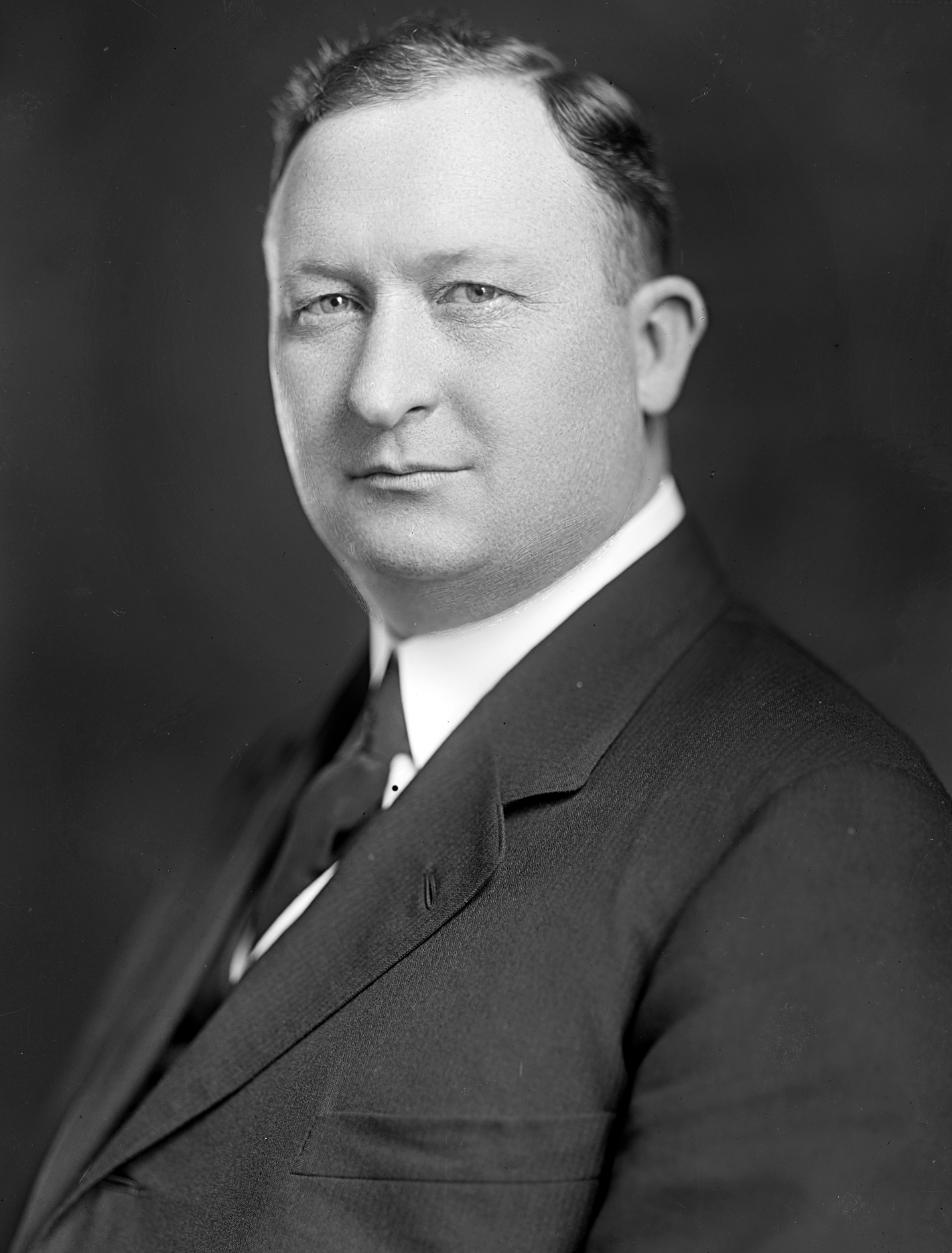

Member of the U.S. House of Representatives from Indiana's 9th district
- In office March 4, 1917 – March 3, 1933
- Preceded by: Martin A. Morrison
- Succeeded by: Eugene B. Crowe

Personal details
- Born: October 25, 1882 Veedersburg, Indiana, U.S.
- Died: October 21, 1939 (aged 56) Washington, D.C., U.S
- Party: Republican
- Education: Indiana University

Fred Sampson Purnell (October 25, 1882 – October 21, 1939) was an American lawyer and politician who served eight terms as a U.S. representative from Indiana from 1917 to 1933.

== Biography ==
Born on a farm near Veedersburg, Indiana, Purnell attended the common schools and the high school at Veedersburg. He was graduated from the law department of Indiana University at Bloomington in 1904. He was admitted to the bar the same year and commenced practice in Attica, Indiana. City attorney of Attica 1910–1914. He resumed the practice of his profession. He was an unsuccessful candidate for election in 1914 to the Sixty-fourth Congress.

=== Congress ===
Purnell was elected as a Republican to the Sixty-fifth and to the seven succeeding Congresses (March 4, 1917 – March 3, 1933). He was an unsuccessful candidate for reelection in 1932 to the Seventy-third Congress and for election in 1934 to the Seventy-fourth Congress.

=== Later career and death ===
He resumed the practice of law in Attica, Indiana. He moved to Washington, D.C., in April 1939 and served as an attorney in the General Accounting Office until his resignation on October 1, 1939.

He died in Washington, D.C., October 21, 1939. He was interred in Rockfield Cemetery, near Veedersburg, Indiana.

U.S. House of Representatives
Preceded by Martin A. Morrison	Member of the U.S. House of Representatives from Indiana's 9th congressional district March 4, 1917 – March 3, 1933	Succeeded by Eugene B. Crowe
