= Charles B. Landis =

American politician from Indiana (1858–1922)

Charles Landis
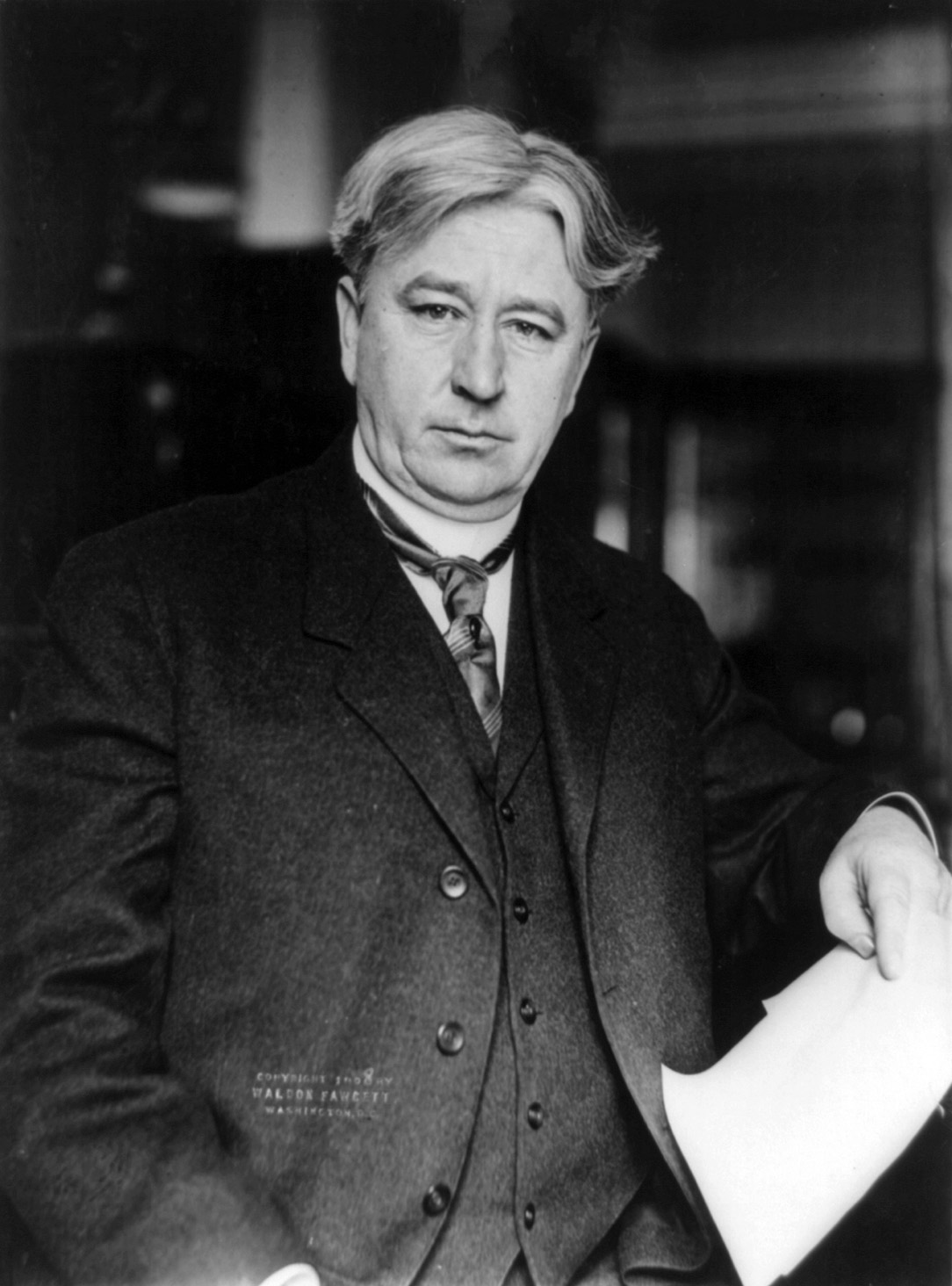

Member of the U.S. House of Representatives from Indiana's 9th district
- In office March 4, 1897 – March 3, 1909
- Preceded by: Frank Hanly
- Succeeded by: Martin A. Morrison

Personal details
- Born: July 9, 1858 Millville, Ohio, U.S.
- Died: April 24, 1922 (aged 63) Asheville, North Carolina, U.S
- Party: Republican
- Education: Wabash College

Charles Beary Landis (July 9, 1858 – April 24, 1922) was an American newspaperman and politician who served six terms as a U.S. representative from Indiana from 1897 to 1909.

== Early life and career ==
He was a brother of both Congressman Frederick Landis and of Baseball Commissioner Kenesaw Mountain Landis.

Born in Millville, Ohio, Landis attended the public schools of Logansport, Indiana, and graduated from Wabash College, Crawfordsville, Indiana, in 1883, where he was a member of Tau chapter of Beta Theta Pi. He was editor of the Logansport Journal 1883-1887 (which later became part of the Pharos-Tribune) and at the time of his nomination for Congress was editor of the Delphi (Indiana) Journal. He served as president of the Indiana Republican Editorial Association in 1894 and 1895.

== Congress ==
Landis was elected as a Republican to the Fifty-fifth and to the five succeeding Congresses (March 4, 1897 – March 3, 1909). He was an unsuccessful candidate for reelection in 1908.

== Later career and death ==
Landis resumed newspaper work in Delphi, Indiana. He died at the age of 63 in Asheville, North Carolina, where he had gone because of impaired health, April 24, 1922. He was interred in Mount Hope Cemetery, Logansport, Indiana.

U.S. House of Representatives
Preceded by Frank Hanly	Member of the U.S. House of Representatives from Indiana's 9th congressional district March 4, 1897 – March 3, 1909	Succeeded by Martin A. Morrison
