= Roberts, Indiana =

Unincorporated community in Indiana, U.S.

Coordinates: 40°18′58″N 87°06′08″W

Roberts is an unincorporated community in Fountain County, Indiana, in the United States. An early variant name of the community was Fido.

== History ==
A post office was established at Roberts in 1890 and remained in operation until it was discontinued in 1901.
