= Shawnee Township, Fountain County, Indiana =

Shawnee Township
- Township
- Location of Shawnee Township in Fountain County
- Coordinates: 40°13′18″N 87°15′38″W
- Country: United States
- State: Indiana
- County: Fountain

Government
  - Type: Indiana township

Area
  - Total: 34.82 sq mi (90.2 km^{2})
  - Land: 34.67 sq mi (89.8 km^{2})
  - Water: 0.16 sq mi (0.41 km^{2})
- Elevation: 673 ft (205 m)

Population (2020)
  - Total: 662
  - Density: 19.1/sq mi (7.37/km^{2})
- FIPS code: 18-69084
- GNIS feature ID: 453841

Shawnee Township is one of eleven townships in Fountain County, Indiana, United States. As of the 2020 census, its population was 662 and it contained 284 housing units.

Historical population
Census	Pop.	Note	%±
1890	1,178		—
1900	1,121		−4.8%
1910	988		−11.9%
1920	770		−22.1%
1930	781		1.4%
1940	681		−12.8%
1950	652		−4.3%
1960	631		−3.2%
1970	596		−5.5%
1980	657		10.2%
1990	585		−11.0%
2000	616		5.3%
2010	672		9.1%
2020	662		−1.5%
Source: US Decennial Census

== Geography ==
According to the 2010 census, the township has a total area of 34.82 square miles (90.2 km^{2}), of which 34.67 square miles (89.8 km^{2}) (or 99.57%) is land and 0.16 square miles (0.41 km^{2}) (or 0.46%) is water. It contains no incorporated settlements. The unincorporated communities of Aylesworth and Rob Roy both lie along the route of U.S. Route 41, while Fountain is in the far west on the east banks of the Wabash River. State Road 55 shares the route of U.S. 41 south from Attica until it reaches Rob Roy, at which point State Road 55 goes east while U.S. 41 continues south.

Map of Shawnee Township

=== Cemeteries ===
Beulah Cemetery lies in the northeast part of the township; Brown Cemetery lies in the southwest.
