= Millcreek Township, Fountain County, Indiana =

Millcreek Township
- Township
- Location of Millcreek Township in Fountain County
- Coordinates: 40°00′33″N 87°15′29″W
- Country: United States
- State: Indiana
- County: Fountain

Government
  - Type: Indiana township

Area
  - Total: 42.94 sq mi (111.2 km^{2})
  - Land: 42.71 sq mi (110.6 km^{2})
  - Water: 0.24 sq mi (0.62 km^{2})
- Elevation: 692 ft (211 m)

Population (2020)
  - Total: 1,385
  - Density: 32.43/sq mi (12.52/km^{2})
- FIPS code: 18-49392
- GNIS feature ID: 453627

Millcreek Township is one of eleven townships in Fountain County, Indiana, United States. As of the 2020 census, its population was 1,385 and it contained 791 housing units. It contains the census-designated place of Lake Holiday Hideaway.

Historical population
Census	Pop.	Note	%±
1890	1,974		—
1900	2,145		8.7%
1910	1,987		−7.4%
1920	1,742		−12.3%
1930	1,452		−16.6%
1940	1,542		6.2%
1950	1,469		−4.7%
1960	1,349		−8.2%
1970	1,348		−0.1%
1980	1,475		9.4%
1990	1,450		−1.7%
2000	1,610		11.0%
2010	1,406		−12.7%
2020	1,385		−1.5%
Source: US Decennial Census

== History ==
The Clinton F. Hesler Farm was listed on the National Register of Historic Places in 1989.

== Geography ==
According to the 2010 census, the township has a total area of 42.94 square miles (111.2 km^{2}), of which 42.71 square miles (110.6 km^{2}) (or 99.46%) is land and 0.24 square miles (0.62 km^{2}) (or 0.56%) is water. It contains the town of Kingman in the southwest along Indiana State Road 234. The unincorporated community of Centennial, with its cemetery of the same name, lies to the northeast on U.S. Route 41; further north, at the intersection with Indiana State Road 32, lies Steam Corner. Harveysburg is north of Kingman and Yeddo is west of Centennial.

Map of Millcreek Township

== Education ==
Millcreek Township residents may obtain a free library card at the Kingman-Millcreek Public Library in Kingman.
