= The Neighbor (newspaper) =

Newspaper in Fountain County, Indiana

- The 15 November 2006 front page of The Neighbor
- Type: Weekly newspaper
- Format: Broadsheet
- Publisher: Twin State's Publishing; Watseka, Illinois
- Editor: Carla Waters
- Founded: 1851
- Headquarters: P.O. Box 280; Attica, IN 47918; United States
- Sister newspapers: Williamsport Review Republican
- ISSN: 1060-5495
- Website: www.fountaincountyneighbor.com

The Neighbor is a weekly newspaper serving Fountain and Warren counties in Indiana, founded 1851. It is published weekly on Tuesdays and is a member of the Hoosier State Press Association.

The Neighbor has previously been known as The Ledger Tribune , The Star Tribune (1985–1991), and the Fountain County Neighbor (1991–1999).
