= W. H. York Round Barn =

- U.S. National Register of Historic Places
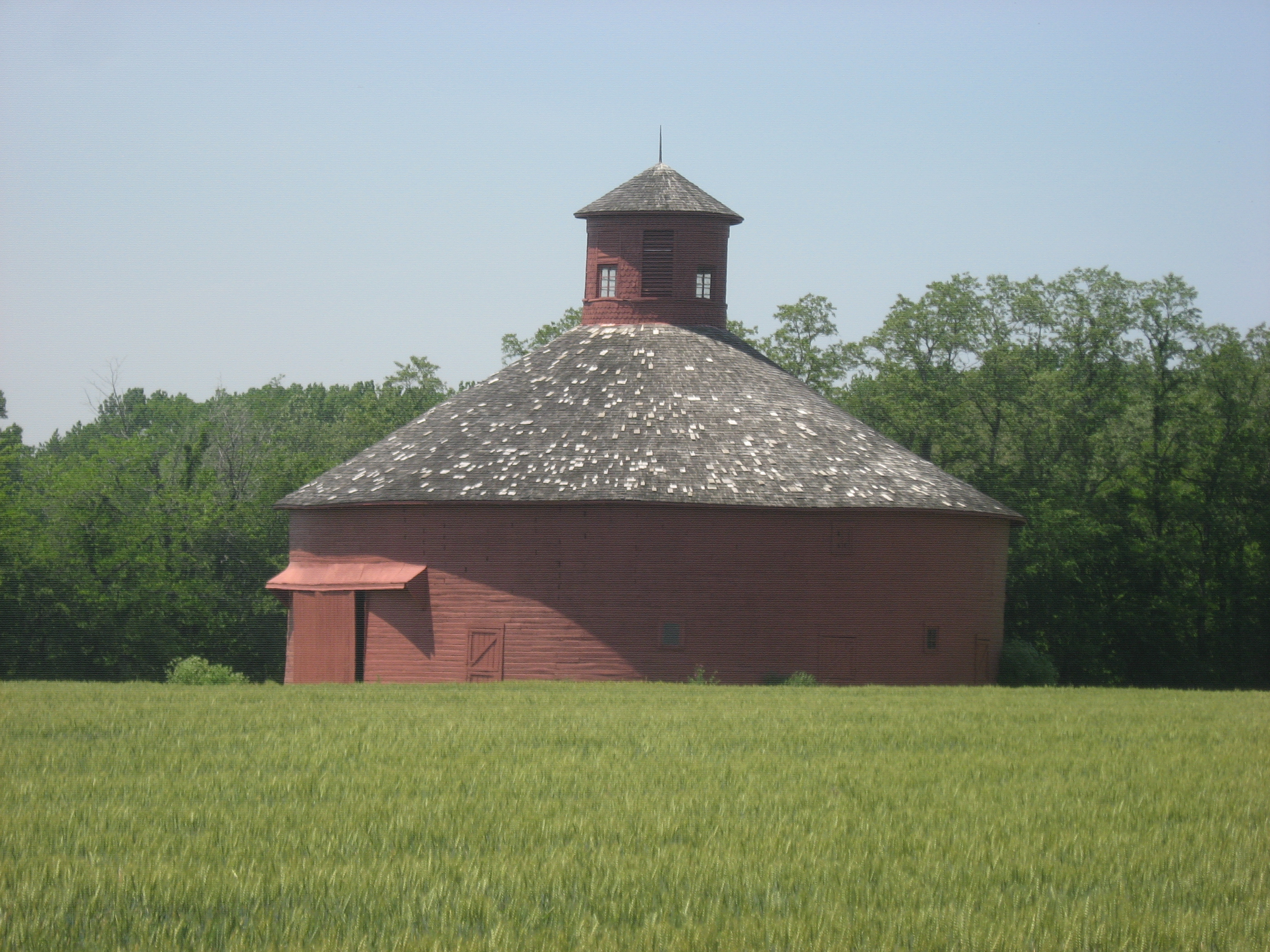
- The barn among surrounding fields

- Location within Parke County, Indiana Location within Indiana Location within the United States
- Location: County Road 249, 0.5 miles southeast of Lodi in Liberty Township, Parke County, Indiana
- Coordinates: 39°56′39.72″N 87°23′44.3″W
- Area: less than one acre
- Built: c. 1895
- MPS: Round and Polygonal Barns of Indiana MPS
- NRHP reference No.: 93000949
- Added to NRHP: September 16, 1993

The W. H. York Round Barn, also known as Thompson Barn, is a historic round barn located on Country Road 249 (CR-249) a half mile south of Lodi, in Liberty Township, Parke County, Indiana. It was built about 1895, and is a two-level wood-frame structure on a brick foundation. The barn measures 56 feet in diameter. It has a conical roof topped by a circular cupola.

It was listed on the National Register of Historic Places in 1993.

== See also ==
- List of Registered Historic Places in Indiana
- Parke County Covered Bridges
- Parke County Covered Bridge Festival
