= Martin A. Morrison =

American politician

Martin Morrison
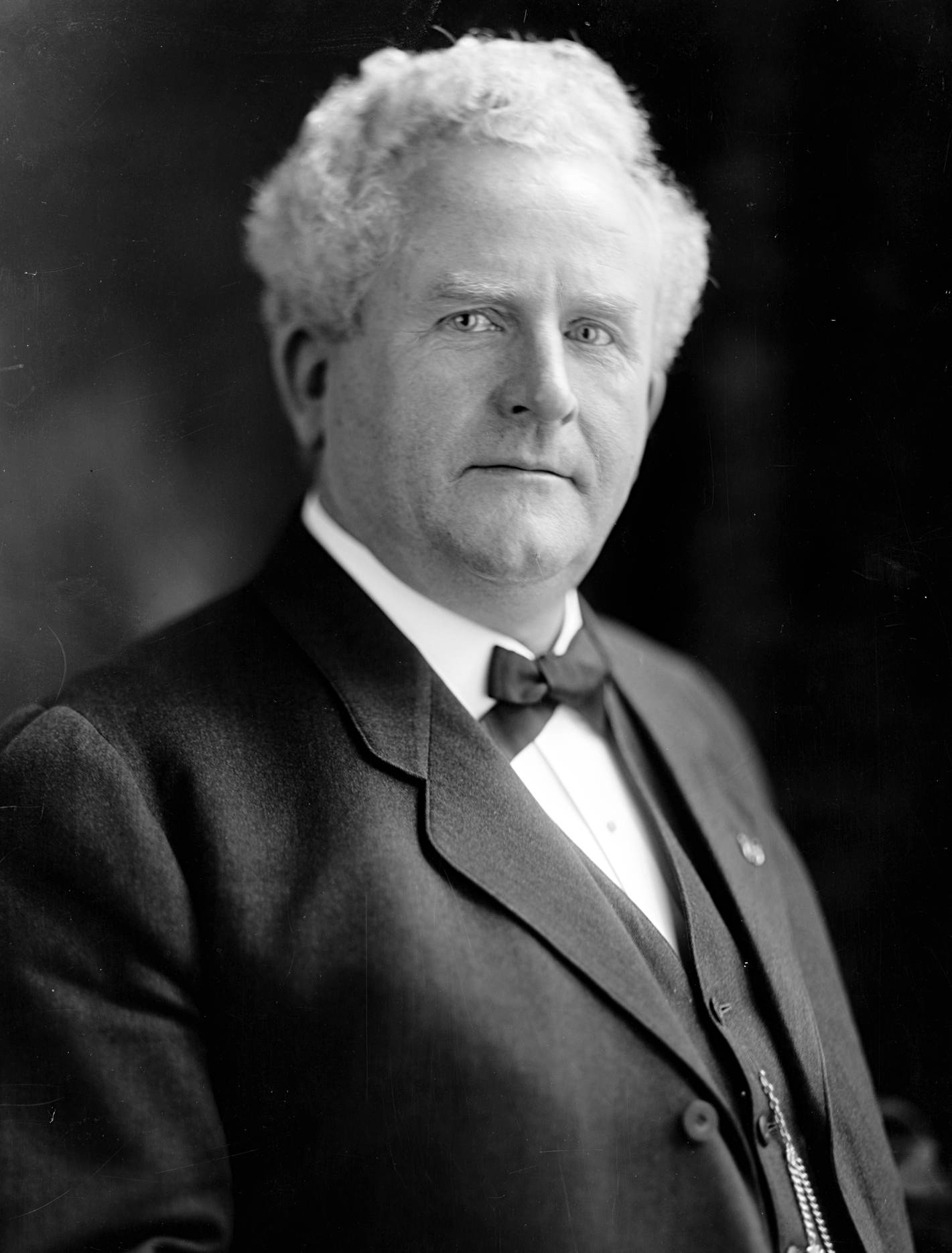

Member of the U.S. House of Representatives from Indiana's 9th district
- In office March 4, 1909 – March 3, 1917
- Preceded by: Charles B. Landis
- Succeeded by: Fred S. Purnell

Personal details
- Born: April 15, 1862 Frankfort, Indiana, U.S.
- Died: July 9, 1944 (aged 82) Abingdon, Virginia, U.S
- Party: Democratic
- Education: University of Virginia

Martin Andrew Morrison (April 15, 1862 – July 9, 1944) was a U.S. representative from Indiana.

Born in Frankfort, Indiana, Morrison attended a public school. He graduated from Butler College, Irvington, Indiana, in June 1883 and from the law department of the University of Virginia at Charlottesville in 1886. He was admitted to the bar the same year and began his law practice in Frankfort, Indiana. County attorney of Clinton County in 1905 and 1906. He served as member of the board of education 1907–1909.

Morrison was elected as a Democrat to the Sixty-first and to the three succeeding Congresses (March 4, 1909 – March 3, 1917).

He served as chairman of the Committee on Patents (Sixty-fourth Congress).

He was not a candidate for renomination in 1916, but instead resumed the practice of law.

He served as President of the United States Civil Service Commission from March 1919 to July 1921 and became a member of the legal staff of the chief counsel of the Federal Trade Commission at Washington, D.C., on December 10, 1925, and served until his retirement on April 30, 1942, maintaining his residence in Washington, D.C.

He died in Abingdon, Virginia on July 9, 1944, while on a vacation.

He was buried in Bunnell Cemetery, Frankfort, Indiana.

U.S. House of Representatives
Preceded by Charles B. Landis	Member of the U.S. House of Representatives from Indiana's 9th congressional district March 4, 1909 – March 3, 1917	Succeeded by Fred S. Purnell
