= Yeddo, Indiana =

- Unincorporated community
- Fountain County's location in Indiana

- Yeddo's location in Fountain County
- Coordinates: 40°00′41″N 87°15′36″W
- Country: United States
- State: Indiana
- County: Fountain
- Township: Millcreek
- Elevation: 686 ft (209 m)
- ZIP code: 47952
- FIPS code: 18-85796
- GNIS feature ID: 446374

Yeddo is an unincorporated community in Millcreek Township, Fountain County, Indiana.

== History ==
Yeddo had a post office between 1881 and 1964. Its name commemorates Yeddo, now known as Tokyo.
