= Lodi, Indiana =

Unincorporated community in Indiana, United States

- Unincorporated community
- Parke County's location in Indiana

- Location in Parke County
- Coordinates: 39°57′00″N 87°24′21″W
- Country: United States
- State: Indiana
- County: Parke
- Township: Liberty
- Elevation: 502 ft (153 m)
- Time zone: UTC-5 (Eastern (EST))
  - Summer (DST): UTC-4 (EDT)
- ZIP code: 47952
- Area code: 765
- GNIS feature ID: 438217

Lodi (also called Fullerton, Gilderoy or Waterman) is an unincorporated community in Liberty Township, Parke County, Indiana. Located on Indiana State Road 234, the most prominent feature is Waterman Baptist Church, which occupies a red brick building in the north-east corner of town. Just south of the town is one of the first round barns, the W. H. York Round Barn, which was built in 1895.

== History ==
=== Founding ===
Lazarus Shirk first settled on Coal Creek in 1826 followed by James Marks in March 1830. The town was platted as Fullerton by Peter Blakewell on April 11, 1836. It may have been named for Robert Fulton who built the first successful steamboat. Jesse Bowen and Elijah Thompson owned all of the land and the east hill was called Golderay.

=== Renamings ===
Less than a year later though the town would change its name to Lodi on January 26, 1837. It may have been named for the city of Lodi, Italy near Milan, Italy, where Napoleon won a great victory over the Austrians in 1796. The Post Office was officially call Lodiville.

Once again the town's name changed in 1857 to Waterman in honor of Dr. Waterman who had opened a pork packing plant and store in town. In 1874 an R.M. Waterman owned large coal fields north of town.

=== Industry and Businesses ===
The Wabash and Erie Canal passed around Lodi on the west side and wrapped around the south side before crossing Coal Creek and continuing its journey south. A feeder dam was built on coal creek. The last canal boat to pass Lodi was in 1875 heading north to Lafayette.

Along with the pork packing plant by the 1880s Lodi's businesses included the Lewis Davis and Charles Bright flour mill, drug store, dry goods store, grocery store, two blacksmith shops, sawmill, Masonic Lodge, G.A.R. Post, and a school.

North of town there was a health spa, that was built around the Lodi Artesian Well, that operated for many years. In 1913 the well was purchased by a group of Chicago capitalists. They installed a large pipe that allowed the well to flow into a basin. A large dance pavilion and a baseball diamond were built and the resort was most popular during the Depression. The dance pavilion was later converted to a roller skating rink and the well was used to fill the swimming pool. The business came to an end though when, in an attempt to clean the pipe, Fred Clingan instead plugged it. While it may be noted that many were sad to see the local landmark close, others expressed their gratitude for the relief of the sulfurous smell that came from the water.

Today, Lodi remains a small town served by a garage, thrift shop, sign shop, mower and bait shop, vegetable stand, and an archery and gun shop.

== Geography ==
Lodi is located adjacent to the small community of Silverwood.

== See also ==
- List of Registered Historic Places in Indiana
- Parke County Covered Bridges
- Parke County Covered Bridge Festival
