= Marshall Covered Bridge =

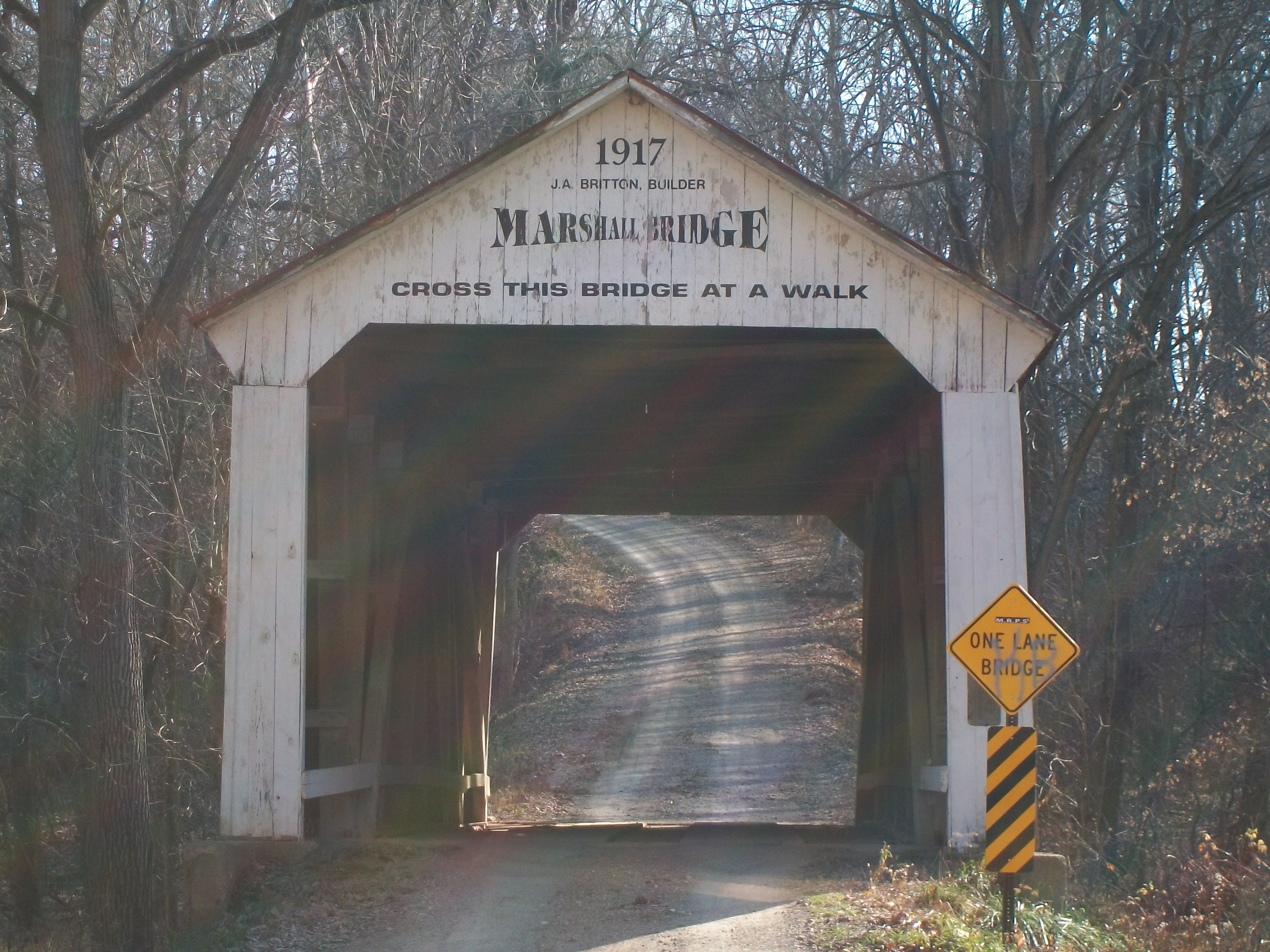
- Coordinates: 39.88346°N 87.32629°W
- Carries: C.R. 800N
- Crosses: Rush Creek
- Locale: Liberty Township, Parke County, Indiana
- Named for: Mahlon Marshall or David W. Marshall
- Owner: Parke County Commissioners; Parke County
- NBI Number: 6100155

Characteristics
- Design: Burr Arch truss single-span bridge
- Material: Wood
- Total length: 74 feet (23 m)
- Width: 15 feet (4.6 m)
- Height: 13 feet (4.0 m)
- Load limit: 5 tonnes (11,000 lb)

History
- Constructed by: Joseph A. Britton
- Construction cost: <$680
- Opened: 1917

Statistics
- Daily traffic: 50
- Marshall Bridge
- U.S. National Register of Historic Places
- U.S. Historic district – Contributing property
- MPS: Parke County Covered Bridges TR
- NRHP reference No.: 78000400
- Added to NRHP: December 22, 1978

Location
- Interactive map of Marshall Covered Bridge

The Marshall Covered Bridge is a single span Burr arch truss covered bridge structure in Liberty Township, Parke County, Indiana that was built by Joseph A. Britton & Son in 1917. The bridge is 74 ft (23 m) long, 15 ft (4.6 m) wide, and 14 ft (4.3 m) high.

It was added to the National Register of Historic Places in 1978.

== Gallery ==
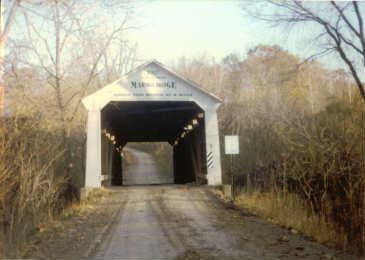
Marshall Bridge in the mid-1990s

== See also ==
- List of Registered Historic Places in Indiana
- Parke County Covered Bridges
- Parke County Covered Bridge Festival
