= Rob Roy, Indiana =

- Unincorporated community and Census-designated place
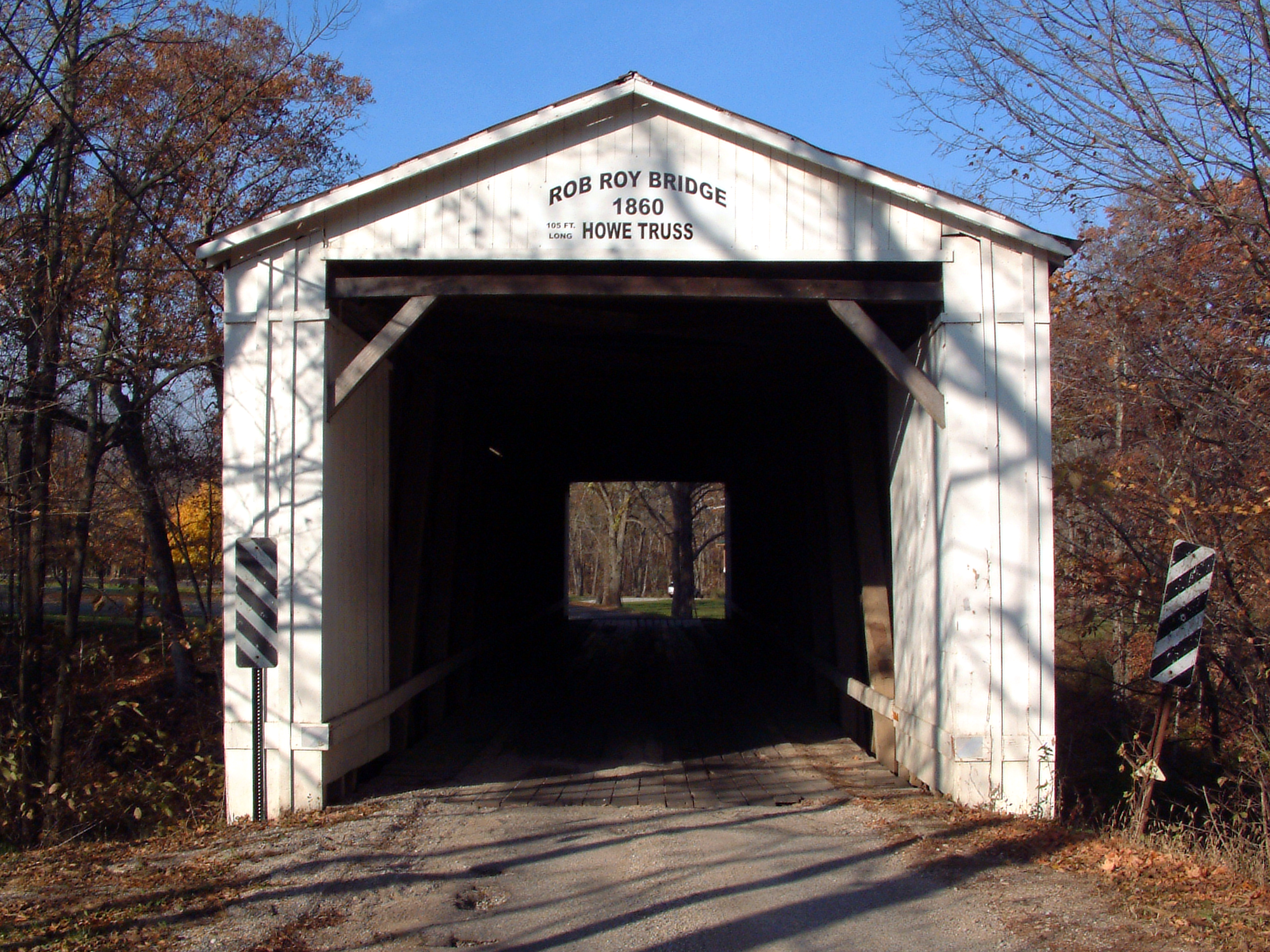
- Rob Roy covered bridge

- Fountain County's location in Indiana

- Rob Roy's location in Fountain County
- Coordinates: 40°14′29″N 87°15′03″W
- Country: United States
- State: Indiana
- County: Fountain
- Township: Shawnee
- Named for: Rob Roy
- Elevation: 637 ft (194 m)
- ZIP code: 47918
- FIPS code: 18-65178
- GNIS feature ID: 2830373

Rob Roy is an unincorporated community in Shawnee Township, Fountain County, Indiana.

== History ==
The town of Rob Roy was named after the Scottish patriot Robert Roy MacGregor by local John I. Foster, a lover of literature who was especially fond of Walter Scott's novels. Foster, described as an inventor and a worker of iron, lived in Rob Roy for six or seven years and founded a Methodist church there.

The town was platted circa 1826 and contained 48 lots, with a further addition on the east side by Hiram Jones in 1829. A writer in 1833 described Rob Roy as a small interior village with few inhabitants but increasing in improvement and population; by 1836 it had "five dry goods stores and four groceries, a hotel, three physicians, and was in the center of a very active settlement." The passage of the Chicago and Block Coal Railway through the town also stimulated growth, but competition with nearby Attica (which was on the Wabash and Erie Canal) eventually led to Rob Roy's demise.

The post office in Rob Roy was established in 1832, and discontinued in 1906.

Rob Roy was heavily damaged by a tornado in April 1953. Today the town consists of a small gathering of homes.

== Demographics ==
The United States Census Bureau defined Rob Roy as a census designated place in the 2022 American Community Survey.
