= Aylesworth, Indiana =

- Unincorporated community
- Fountain County's location in Indiana

- Location in Fountain County
- Coordinates: 40°12′11″N 87°14′50″W
- Country: United States
- State: Indiana
- County: Fountain
- Township: Shawnee
- Elevation: 640 ft (200 m)
- Time zone: UTC-5 (Eastern (EST))
  - Summer (DST): UTC-4 (EDT)
- ZIP code: 47987
- Area code: 765
- FIPS code: 18-02962
- GNIS feature ID: 430367

Aylesworth is an unincorporated community in Shawnee Township, Fountain County, in the U.S. state of Indiana.

== History ==
A post office was established at Aylesworth in 1884, and remained in operation until it was discontinued in 1907.
