= Fountain County, Indiana =

County in Indiana, United States

- County
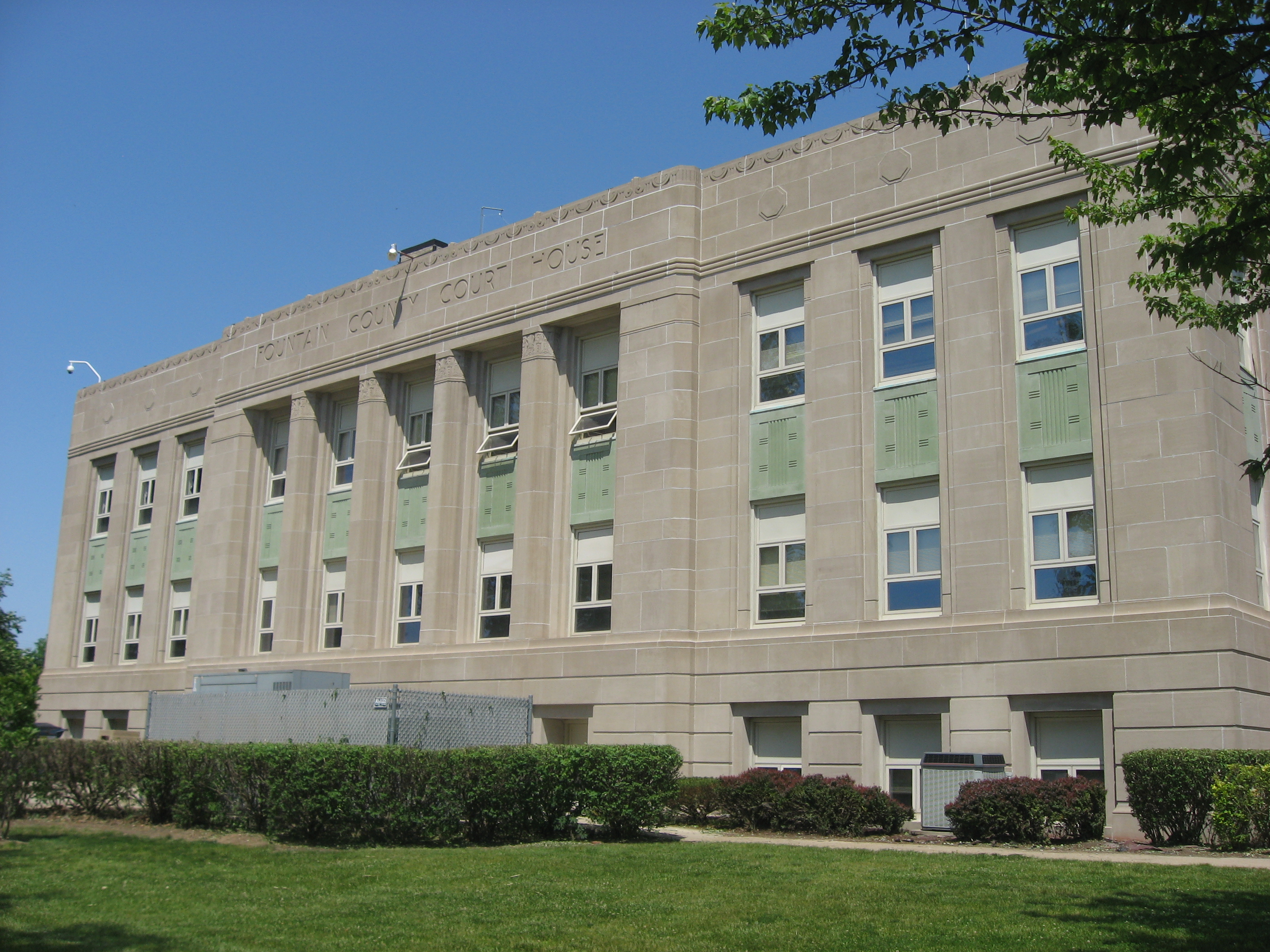
- Fountain County Courthouse

- Seal

- Location within the U.S. state of Indiana
- Coordinates: 40°07′N 87°14′W
- Country: United States
- State: Indiana
- Founded: April 1, 1826
- Named for: James Fontaine
- Seat: Covington
- Largest city: Attica

Area
  - Total: 397.88 sq mi (1,030.5 km^{2})
  - Land: 395.66 sq mi (1,024.8 km^{2})
  - Water: 2.22 sq mi (5.7 km^{2}) 0.56%

Population (2020)
  - Total: 16,479
  - Estimate (2025): 17,013 ▲
  - Density: 41.649/sq mi (16.081/km^{2})
- Time zone: UTC−5 (Eastern)
  - Summer (DST): UTC−4 (EDT)
- Congressional districts: 8th, 4th
- Website: www.fountaincounty.net
- Indiana county number 23; FIPS code 045

Fountain County lies in the western part of the U.S. state of Indiana on the east side of the Wabash River. The county was officially established in 1826 and was the 53rd in Indiana. The county seat is Covington.

According to the 2020 United States census, its population was 16,479. The county has two incorporated cities and six incorporated towns, as well as many small unincorporated communities. It is divided into eleven townships which provide local services. An interstate highway, two U.S. Routes and five Indiana state roads cross the county, as does a major railroad line.

== History ==
Indiana was granted statehood near the end of 1816. The first non-indigenous settler in the future Fountain County is thought to have been a Mr. Forbes, who arrived in early 1823 and was soon followed by others. The legislative act creating Fountain County was passed on December 30, 1825, setting an effective date of April 1, 1826. The county's boundaries have remained unchanged since that time. It was named for Major James Fontaine of Kentucky who was killed at Harmar's Defeat (near modern Fort Wayne, Indiana) on October 22, 1790, during the Northwest Indian War.

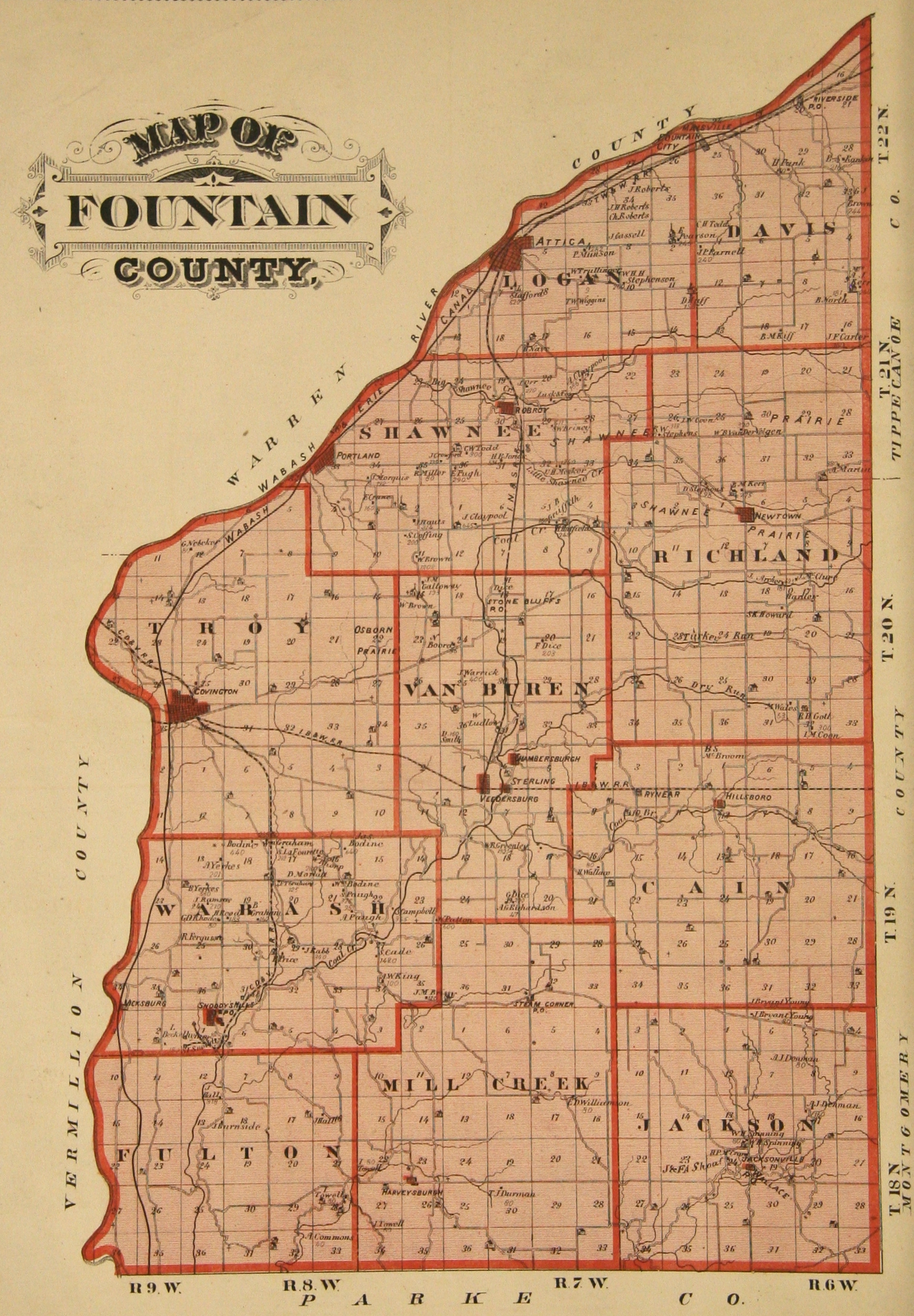
Map of Fountain County from an 1876 atlas

The first Fountain County courthouse was a two-story frame building constructed in Covington in 1827; Abraham Griffith submitted the winning bid of $335. (Note: A $335 capital expense in 1827 would be roughly equivalent to $200,000 in 2009.) In 1829, plans were made for a larger courthouse building, but then an act of the legislature called for the county seat to be moved. In the end it was decided that the county seat should remain in Covington, and the brick courthouse was completed in 1833. A third courthouse was commissioned in 1856, and was completed in 1857 at a cost of $33,500. (Note: A $33,500 capital expense in 1857 would be roughly equivalent to $10,900,000 in 2009.) The circuit court met for the first time in the new building in January 1860, and the building was largely destroyed by fire the same day. Isaac Hodgson was the architect for the rebuilt courthouse, which was first occupied in January 1861; the total cost, including the reconstruction, totaled $54,624.05. (Note: A $54,624 capital expense in 1861 would be roughly equivalent to $17,600,000 in 2009.) The current courthouse was built in 1936–37 at a cost of $246,734; (Note: A $246,734 capital expense in 1936 would be roughly equivalent to $17,300,000 in 2009.) it replaced the previous building which had been declared unsafe. The 1937 building was constructed by the Jacobson Brothers of Chicago; the architects were Louis R. Johnson and Walter Scholar of Lafayette. The courthouse walls display murals painted by Eugene Francis Savage and others from 1937 to 1940, covering 2,500 square feet (232 m^{2}) of wall space and depicting the settlement of western Indiana.

Digging on the Wabash and Erie Canal began in 1832 and worked southwest; it reached Lafayette by 1842. In 1846 it reached Covington, and by 1847 traffic was moving through the county via the canal. Completion of the county's first railroad line in the 1850s heralded an end to the canal's usefulness, and in 1875 the last canal boat passed through Covington.

The first railway line through the county was the Toledo, Wabash and Western Railway (later the Wabash Railroad) which was built from the east across the northern part of the county and reached Attica in 1856; it continued west through Warren County and reached the Illinois state line the following year. The Indianapolis, Crawfordsville and Danville Railroad (later the Indiana, Bloomington and Western Railway), was started in 1855, but the general state of the economy halted construction in 1858. It was completed by another owner in 1870, and traffic started in 1871. It passed through Covington, Veedersburg and Hillsboro.

== Geography ==
Map of Fountain County, showing townships and settlements

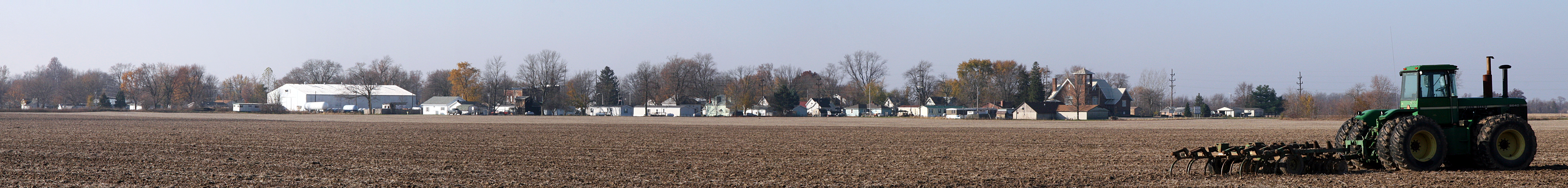
The town of Mellott

Fountain County's northern and western borders are defined by the Wabash River which flows southwesterly out of Tippecanoe County.

According to the 2010 United States census, the county has a total area of 397.88 square miles (1,030.5 km^{2}), of which 395.66 square miles (1,024.8 km^{2}) (or 99.44%) is land and 2.22 square miles (5.7 km^{2}) (or 0.56%) is water. Elevations range from 770 feet (230 m) above sea level in the northeastern part of the county to 465 feet (142 m) in the southwest where the Wabash River leaves the county. The county is within the drainage basin of the Wabash River, sloping to the southwest. It is covered with loess ranging in thickness from a few inches to more than 7 feet (2.1 m). Approximately 84 percent of the county's land is use for agriculture.

The Portland Arch Nature Preserve and the Miller-Campbell Memorial Tract, a 435-acre (176 ha) preserve managed by the Indiana Department of Natural Resources, are located adjacent to the Wabash River.

=== Adjacent counties ===
- Warren County - north
- Tippecanoe County - northeast
- Montgomery County - east.
- Parke County - south
- Vermillion County - southwest

=== Communities ===
==== Cities ====
- Attica
- Covington (county seat)

==== Incorporated towns ====
- Hillsboro
- Kingman
- Mellott
- Newtown
- Veedersburg
- Wallace

==== Census-designated place ====
- Lake Holiday Hideaway

==== Unincorporated communities ====
- Aylesworth
- Cates
- Centennial
- Coal Creek
- Fountain
- Harveysburg
- Riverside
- Rob Roy
- Roberts
- Silverwood
- Steam Corner
- Stone Bluff
- Vine
- Yeddo

==== Previous settlements ====
- Stringtown - abandoned mining settlement south of Covington

There are several coal mines in southwest Fountain County.

==== Townships ====
- Cain (July 24, 1826)
- Davis
- Fulton
- Jackson
- Logan
- Millcreek
- Richland (July 24, 1826)
- Shawnee (July 24, 1826)
- Troy (July 24, 1826)
- Van Buren
- Wabash (July 24, 1826)

== Transportation ==
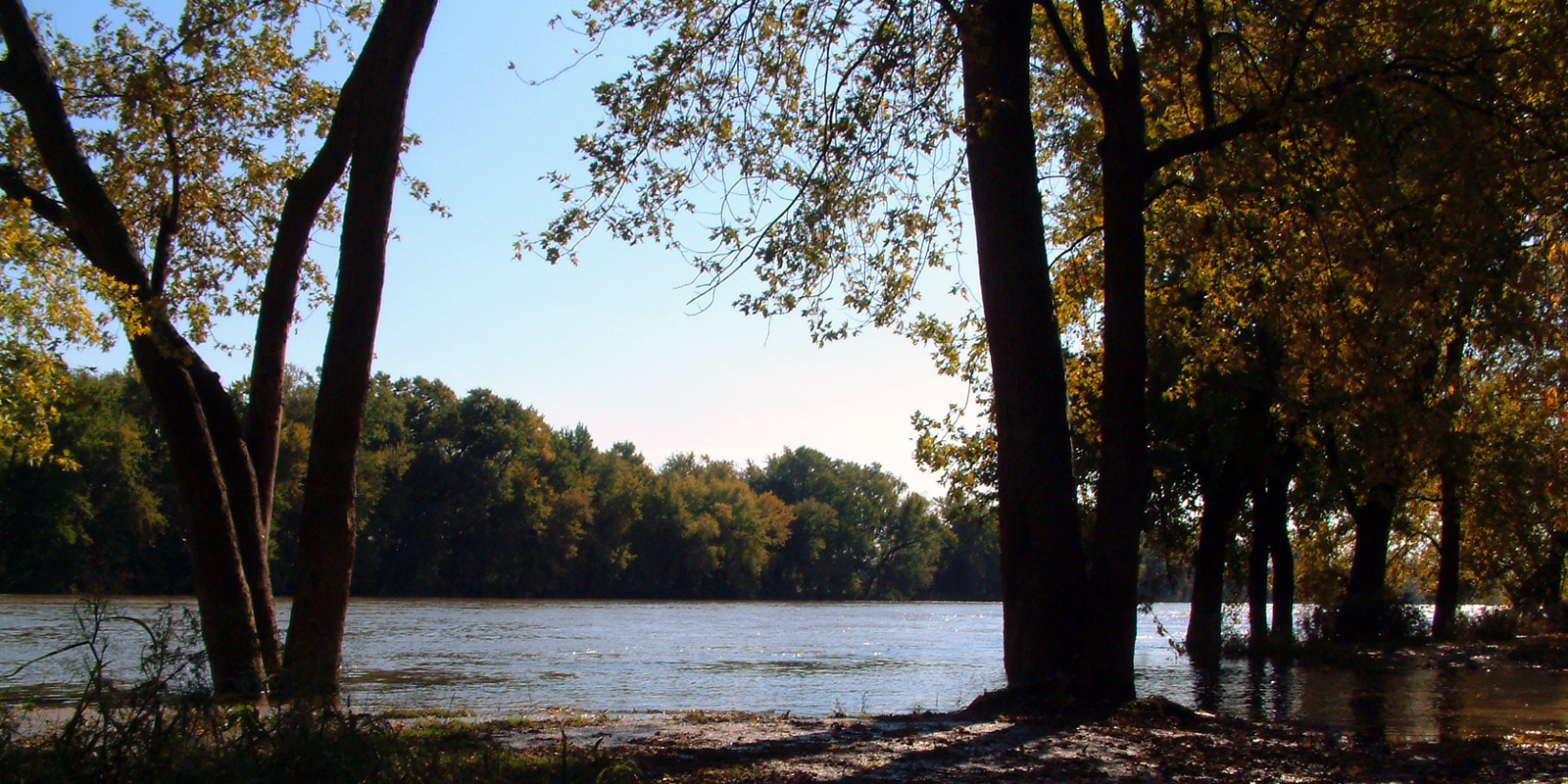
Looking across the Wabash River to Fountain County

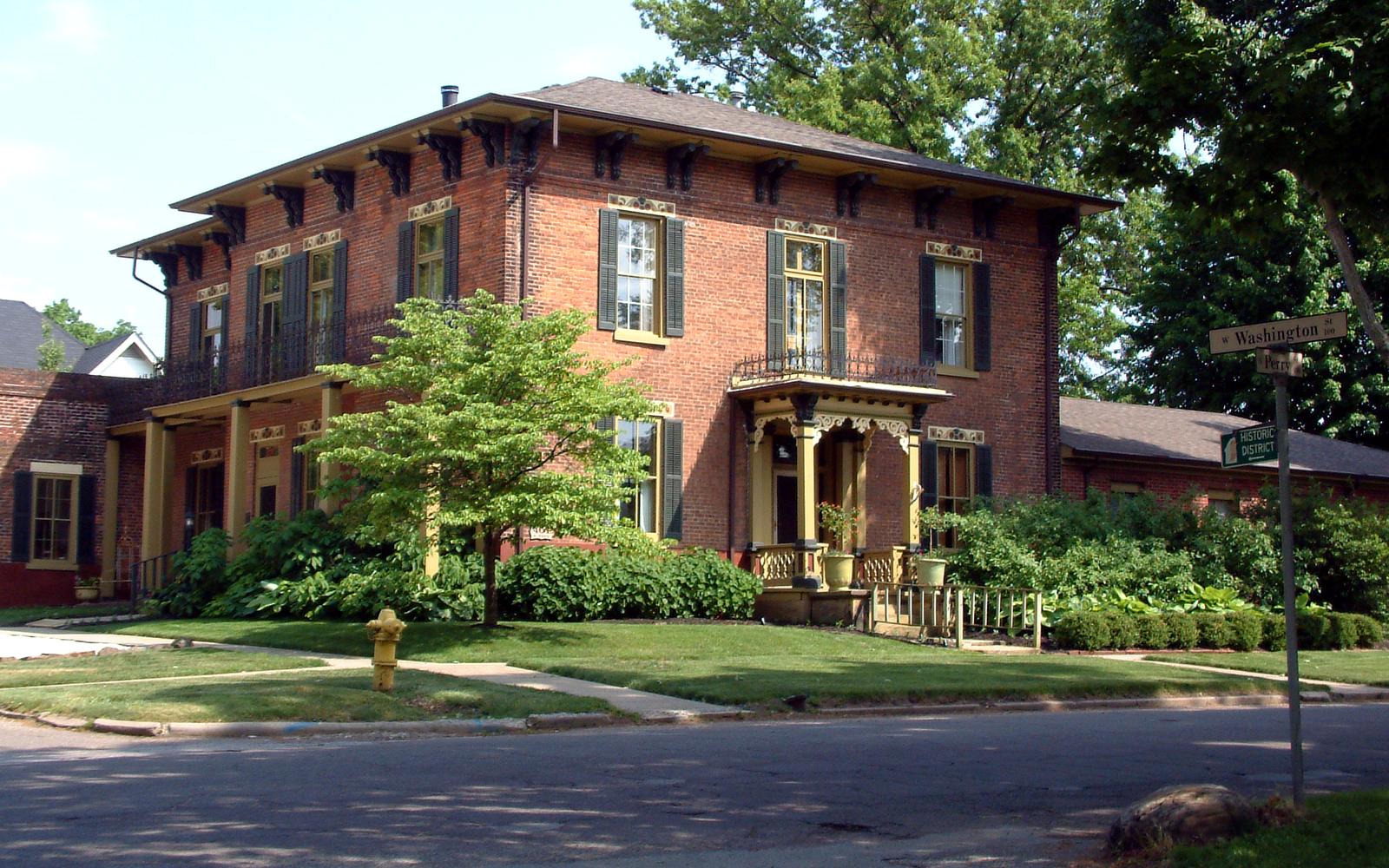
A 19th-century home in Attica

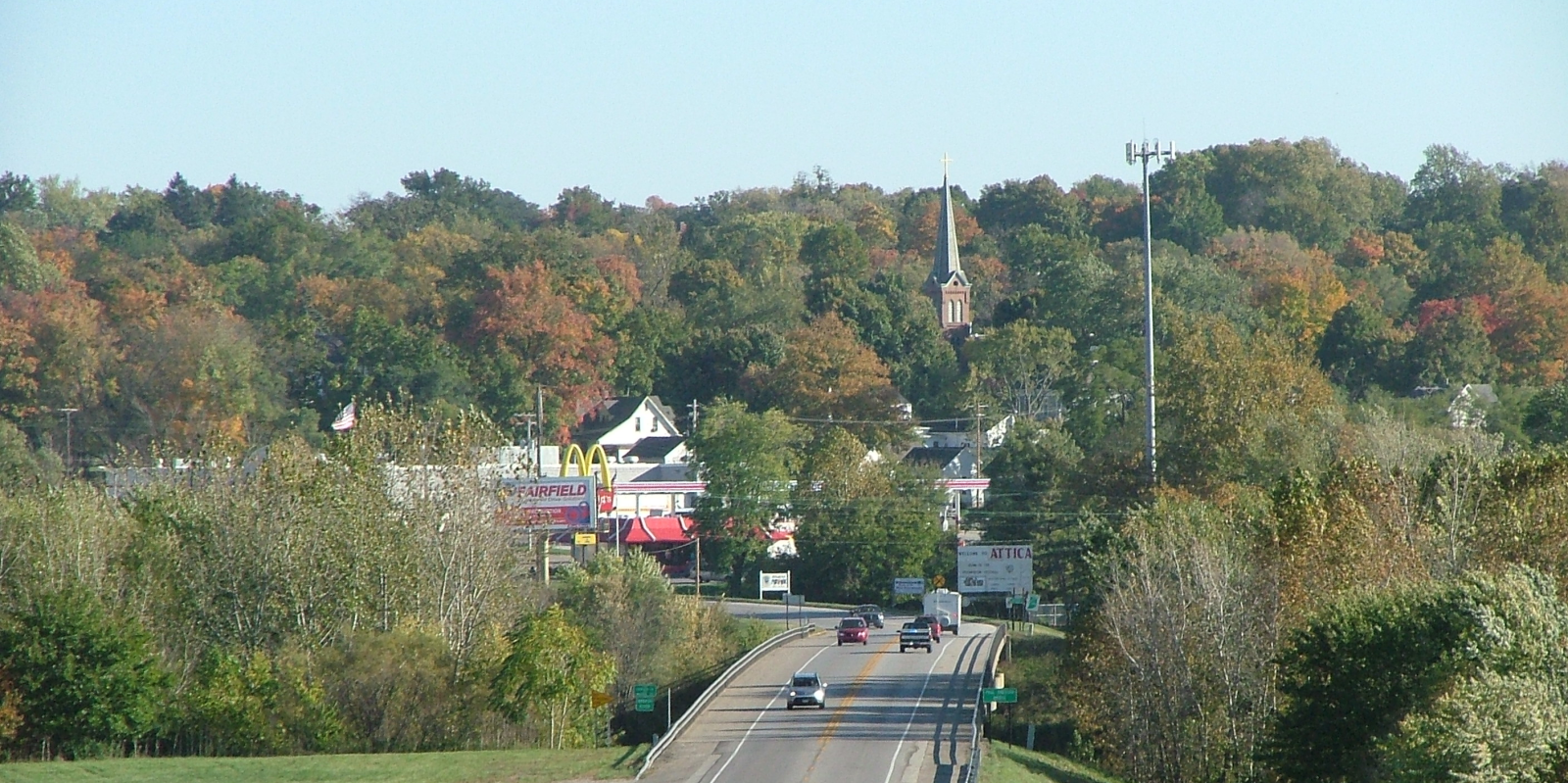
Attica from the west

=== Highways ===
Interstate 74 runs east–west through the middle of Fountain County. US Route 136 follows the same general east–west route of I-74 through the county; in the eastern part it runs on the south side of the interstate, but crosses to the north side between Veedersburg and Covington. US Route 41 runs north–south through the county, passing through Attica and Veedersburg.

Three east–west state roads cross the county. State Road 28 enters Attica from Warren County and crosses the north end of the county. State Road 32 enters the middle of the county from Perrysville to the west and passes through Fountain County on its way to Crawfordsville to the east. State Road 234, further to the south, enters from Cayuga to the west and passes east through Kingman. Two north–south state roads run through the county. State Road 55 passes through Attica and shares the route of US Route 41 running goes south. At Rob Roy it turns to run southeast through Newton. State Road 341 starts at State Road 28 in the north and runs south, ending at State Road 234.

=== Railroads ===
A Norfolk Southern Railway line crosses northern Fountain County on its route between Danville, Illinois and Lafayette, Indiana; it carries about 45 freight trains each day.

=== Air transportation ===
There are no public-use airports within the boundary of Fountain County; air service is available at nearby airports:

- Purdue University Airport - Indiana's second busiest airport, in Tippecanoe County, is operated by Purdue University.
- Indianapolis International Airport is located about 70 miles (110 km) east of Fountain County.

== Climate and weather ==
Covington, Indiana

Climate chart (precipitation, max. and min. temperature)
J	F	M	A	M	J	J	A	S	O	N	D
1.9 32 15	1.8 38 20	2.8 49 29	3.4 62 39	4.3 73 50	4.5 82 60	4.2 85 63	3.7 83 60	3.1 77 52	2.8 65 41	3.2 50 33	2.5 37 21
- █ Average max. and min. temperatures in °F
- █ Precipitation totals in inches
- Source: The Weather Channel
Metric conversion
J	F	M	A	M	J	J	A	S	O	N	D
49 0 −9	46 3 −7	72 9 −2	86 17 4	108 23 10	115 28 16	106 29 17	93 28 16	77 25 11	71 18 5	81 10 1	65 3 −6
- █ Average max. and min. temperatures in °C
- █ Precipitation totals in mm

Fountain County is in the humid continental climate region of the United States along with most of Indiana. Its Köppen climate classification is Dfa, meaning that it is cold, has no dry season, and has a hot summer. In recent years, average temperatures in the county seat of Covington have ranged from a low of 15 °F (−9 °C) in January to a high of 85 °F (29 °C) in July, although a record low of −26 °F (−32 °C) was recorded in January 1994 and a record high of 105 °F (41 °C) was recorded in August 1988. Average monthly precipitation ranged from 1.80 inches (46 mm) inches in February to 4.53 inches (115 mm) inches in June.

From 1950 through 2009, six tornadoes were reported in Fountain County, causing $25 million in damage but no fatalities.

== Education ==
Three public bodies administer Fountain County schools:

- Attica Consolidated School Corporation (northern Fountain County) – served 964 students during the 2009–2010 school year. It runs Attica Elementary and Attica Junior-Senior High School.
- Covington Community School Corporation (western Fountain County) – served 1,012 students during 2009–2010. It runs Covington Elementary, Covington Middle, and Covington High Schools.
- Southeast Fountain School Corporation (eastern Fountain County) – served 1,279 students during 2009–2010. It runs Southeast Fountain Elementary and Fountain Central Junior–Senior High Schools.

== Notable people ==
Daniel Wolsey Voorhees was born in Ohio but was raised in Fountain County. He attended school in Veedersburg, graduated from college in 1849, was admitted to the bar, and began practicing law in Covington; he moved to Terre Haute in 1857. He served as a United States Senator (1877–1897), and was known as "the tall sycamore of the Wabash". He died in Washington in 1897 and is buried in Terre Haute.

John Myers was born in Covington in 1927. He graduated from Covington High School, then from Indiana State University in Terre Haute; he served in the United States Army and then served in the US House of Representatives 1967–1997.

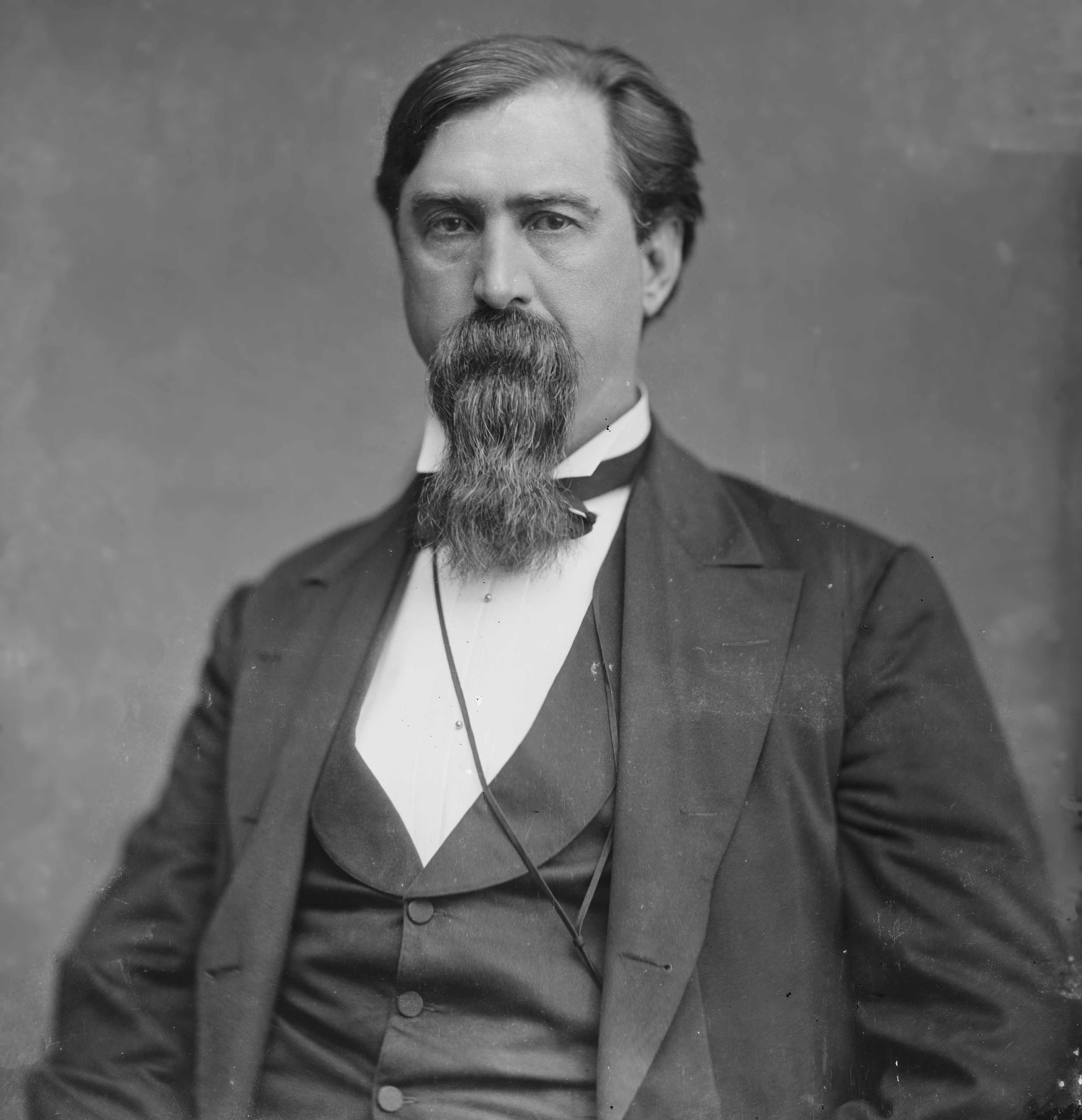
Daniel Voorhees

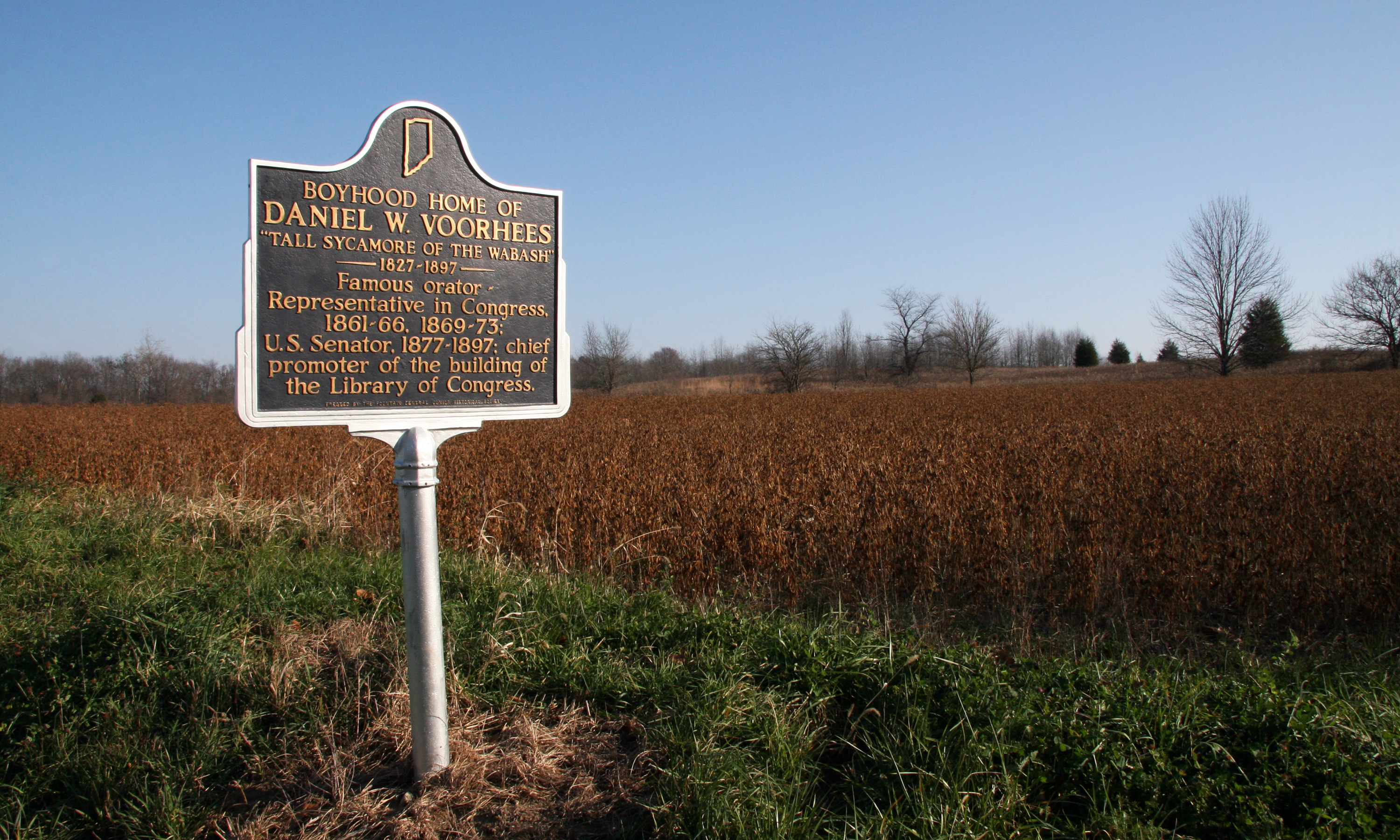
Voorhees historical marker

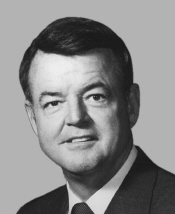
John Myers

== Government ==
The county government is a constitutional body granted specific powers by the Constitution of Indiana and the Indiana Code. The county council is the legislative branch of the county government and controls spending and revenue collection. Representatives are elected to four-year terms from county districts. The council members set salaries, the annual budget and special spending. The council has limited authority to impose local taxes, in the form of an income and property tax that is subject to state level approval, excise taxes and service taxes. In 2010, the county budgeted approximately $9.8 million for the district's schools and $3.2 million for other county operations and services, for a total annual budget of approximately $13 million.

A board of commissioners comprises the county's executive body. The commissioners are elected county-wide, in staggered four–year terms. One commissioner serves as president. The commissioners execute acts legislated by the council, collect revenue, and manage the county government.

The county maintains a circuit court. The judge on the court is elected to a term of six years and must be a lawyer admitted to practice law in Indiana.

The county has other elected offices, including sheriff, coroner, auditor, treasurer, recorder, and circuit court clerk. Each of these elected officers serves a term of four years and oversees a different part of county government. Members elected to county government positions are required to declare party affiliations and be residents of the county.

Each township has a trustee who administers rural fire protection and ambulance service, provides poor relief and manages cemetery care, among other duties. The trustee is assisted by a three-member township board. The trustees and board members are elected to four-year terms.

Based on the 2010 United States census, Fountain County is part of Indiana's 4th congressional district; Indiana Senate district 23; and Indiana House of Representatives districts 13 and 42.

United States presidential election results for Fountain County, Indiana
Year	Republican		Democratic		Third party(ies)	
Year	No.	%	No.	%	No.	%
1888	2,608	49.41%	2,525	47.84%	145	2.75%
1892	2,379	46.60%	2,331	45.66%	395	7.74%
1896	2,809	47.99%	2,997	51.20%	47	0.80%
1900	3,015	49.93%	2,896	47.96%	127	2.10%
1904	3,060	52.08%	2,560	43.57%	256	4.36%
1908	2,894	48.90%	2,846	48.09%	178	3.01%
1912	1,560	28.84%	2,499	46.19%	1,351	24.97%
1916	2,634	48.36%	2,437	44.74%	376	6.90%
1920	5,218	54.09%	4,088	42.38%	341	3.53%
1924	4,796	51.28%	4,282	45.78%	275	2.94%
1928	4,960	55.60%	3,894	43.65%	67	0.75%
1932	4,162	41.83%	5,665	56.93%	123	1.24%
1936	4,663	45.20%	5,617	54.45%	36	0.35%
1940	5,771	54.59%	4,783	45.24%	18	0.17%
1944	5,557	57.74%	4,022	41.79%	46	0.48%
1948	5,186	54.76%	4,215	44.50%	70	0.74%
1952	6,208	61.35%	3,871	38.25%	40	0.40%
1956	6,456	63.11%	3,751	36.67%	23	0.22%
1960	6,123	58.71%	4,277	41.01%	29	0.28%
1964	4,666	45.40%	5,574	54.23%	38	0.37%
1968	5,110	53.02%	3,237	33.59%	1,290	13.39%
1972	5,979	66.41%	2,977	33.07%	47	0.52%
1976	4,903	54.16%	4,089	45.17%	60	0.66%
1980	5,289	62.18%	2,845	33.45%	372	4.37%
1984	5,450	64.90%	2,897	34.50%	50	0.60%
1988	5,113	60.57%	3,279	38.85%	49	0.58%
1992	3,391	40.32%	2,829	33.64%	2,190	26.04%
1996	3,984	54.03%	2,327	31.56%	1,063	14.42%
2000	4,408	60.54%	2,717	37.32%	156	2.14%
2004	5,260	67.40%	2,477	31.74%	67	0.86%
2008	4,158	55.99%	3,094	41.66%	174	2.34%
2012	4,664	65.59%	2,237	31.46%	210	2.95%
2016	5,662	75.15%	1,476	19.59%	396	5.26%
2020	6,154	76.99%	1,629	20.38%	210	2.63%
2024	6,311	79.07%	1,526	19.12%	145	1.82%

== Demographics ==
Historical population
Census	Pop.	Note	%±
1830	7,619		—
1840	11,218		47.2%
1850	13,253		18.1%
1860	15,566		17.5%
1870	16,389		5.3%
1880	20,228		23.4%
1890	19,558		−3.3%
1900	21,446		9.7%
1910	20,439		−4.7%
1920	18,823		−7.9%
1930	17,971		−4.5%
1940	18,299		1.8%
1950	17,836		−2.5%
1960	18,706		4.9%
1970	18,257		−2.4%
1980	19,033		4.3%
1990	17,808		−6.4%
2000	17,954		0.8%
2010	17,240		−4.0%
2020	16,479		−4.4%
2025 (est.)	17,013	▲	3.2%
US Decennial Census; 1790-1960 1900-1990; 1990-2000 2010

=== Racial and ethnic composition ===
Fountain County, Indiana – Racial and ethnic composition Note: the US Census treats Hispanic/Latino as an ethnic category. This table excludes Latinos from the racial categories and assigns them to a separate category. Hispanics/Latinos may be of any race.
Race / Ethnicity (NH = Non-Hispanic)	Pop 1980	Pop 1990	Pop 2000	Pop 2010	Pop 2020	% 1980	% 1990	% 2000	% 2010	% 2020
White alone (NH)	18,902	17,667	17,599	16,598	15,349	99.31%	99.21%	98.02%	96.28%	93.14%
Black or African American alone (NH)	4	3	19	26	56	0.02%	0.02%	0.11%	0.15%	0.34%
Native American or Alaska Native alone (NH)	16	25	34	48	38	0.08%	0.14%	0.19%	0.28%	0.23%
Asian alone (NH)	21	25	32	35	43	0.11%	0.14%	0.18%	0.20%	0.26%
Native Hawaiian or Pacific Islander alone (NH)	x	x	1	1	6	x	x	0.01%	0.01%	0.04%
Other race alone (NH)	8	0	2	7	23	0.04%	0.00%	0.01%	0.04%	0.14%
Mixed race or Multiracial (NH)	x	x	77	152	552	x	x	0.43%	0.88%	3.35%
Hispanic or Latino (any race)	82	88	190	373	412	0.43%	0.49%	1.06%	2.16%	2.50%
Total	19,033	17,808	17,954	17,240	16,479	100.00%	100.00%	100.00%	100.00%	100.00%

=== 2020 census ===
As of the 2020 census, the county had a population of 16,479. The median age was 43.9 years. 21.7% of residents were under the age of 18 and 20.8% of residents were 65 years of age or older. For every 100 females there were 100.4 males, and for every 100 females age 18 and over there were 98.4 males age 18 and over.

The racial makeup of the county was 93.8% White, 0.4% Black or African American, 0.2% American Indian and Alaska Native, 0.3% Asian, 0.1% Native Hawaiian and Pacific Islander, 1.2% from some other race, and 4.0% from two or more races. Hispanic or Latino residents of any race comprised 2.5% of the population.

<0.1% of residents lived in urban areas, while 100.0% lived in rural areas.

There were 6,880 households in the county, of which 27.6% had children under the age of 18 living in them. Of all households, 50.2% were married-couple households, 19.2% were households with a male householder and no spouse or partner present, and 23.3% were households with a female householder and no spouse or partner present. About 28.5% of all households were made up of individuals and 14.1% had someone living alone who was 65 years of age or older.

There were 7,760 housing units, of which 11.3% were vacant. Among occupied housing units, 77.5% were owner-occupied and 22.5% were renter-occupied. The homeowner vacancy rate was 2.3% and the rental vacancy rate was 7.6%.

=== 2010 Census ===
As of the 2010 United States census, there were 17,240 people, 6,935 households, and 4,787 families in the county. The population density was 43.6 inhabitants per square mile (16.8/km^{2}). There were 7,865 housing units at an average density of 19.9 per square mile (7.7/km^{2}). The racial makeup of the county was 97.5% white, 0.2% black or African American, 0.3% Native American, 0.2% Asian, 0.0% Pacific Islander, 0.8% from other races, and 1.0% from two or more races. Those of Hispanic or Latino origin made up 2.2% of the population. In terms of ancestry, 21.6% were German, 14.4% were Irish, 14.3% were American, and 12.5% were English.

Of the 6,935 households, 31.2% had children under the age of 18 living with them, 54.7% were married couples living together, 10.0% had a female householder with no husband present, 31.0% were non-families, and 26.7% of all households were made up of individuals. The average household size was 2.46 and the average family size was 2.95. The median age was 41.6 years.

The median income for a household in the county was $47,697 and the median income for a family was $51,696. Males had a median income of $44,118 versus $28,462 for females. The per capita income for the county was $20,949. About 8.9% of families and 13.2% of the population were below the poverty line, including 18.8% of those under age 18 and 9.5% of those age 65 or over.

== See also ==
- National Register of Historic Places listings in Fountain County, Indiana
- The Neighbor (newspaper)
