= Coal Creek, Indiana =

- Unincorporated community
- Fountain County's location in Indiana

- Coal Creek's location in Fountain County
- Coordinates: 40°02′11″N 87°22′50″W
- Country: United States
- State: Indiana
- County: Fountain
- Township: Wabash
- Elevation: 630 ft (190 m)
- ZIP code: 47932
- FIPS code: 18-13996
- GNIS feature ID: 432703

Coal Creek is an unincorporated community in Wabash Township, Fountain County, Indiana, originally established as "Headley's Mills." According to Records of the U.S. Post Office Department, the name was changed by postmaster Samuel I. Snoddy to "Snoddy's Mills" on 24 October 1864, then changed again by postmaster John D. Orahood to "Coal Creek" on 11 July 1888.

The namesake body of water Coal Creek was so named from deposits of coal along its banks.
