= Stone Bluff, Indiana =

- Unincorporated community and Census-designated place
- Fountain County's location in Indiana

- Stone Bluff's location in Fountain County
- Coordinates: 40°10′08″N 87°15′21″W
- Country: United States
- State: Indiana
- County: Fountain
- Township: Van Buren
- Elevation: 627 ft (191 m)
- ZIP code: 47987
- FIPS code: 18-73376
- GNIS feature ID: 2830374

Stone Bluff is an unincorporated community in Van Buren Township, Fountain County, Indiana.

== History ==
A post office was established at Stone Bluff in 1869, and remained in operation until it was discontinued in 1956.

== Geography ==
Stone Bluff is located about nine miles south of Attica and less than a mile to the west of U.S. Route 41.

== Demographics ==
Historical population
Census	Pop.	Note	%±
2023 (est.)	157

The United States Census Bureau defined Stone Bluff as a census designated place in the 2022 American Community Survey.
