= Wabash Township, Fountain County, Indiana =

Wabash Township
- Township
- Location of Wabash Township in Fountain County
- Coordinates: 40°03′31″N 87°21′26″W
- Country: United States
- State: Indiana
- County: Fountain

Government
  - Type: Indiana township

Area
  - Total: 33.21 sq mi (86.0 km^{2})
  - Land: 32.96 sq mi (85.4 km^{2})
  - Water: 0.25 sq mi (0.65 km^{2})
- Elevation: 600 ft (183 m)

Population (2020)
  - Total: 689
  - Density: 20.9/sq mi (8.07/km^{2})
- FIPS code: 18-79280
- GNIS feature ID: 453963

Wabash Township is one of eleven townships in Fountain County, Indiana. As of the 2020 census, its population was 689 and it contained 335 housing units.

Historical population
Census	Pop.	Note	%±
1890	1,293		—
1900	1,176		−9.0%
1910	1,049		−10.8%
1920	935		−10.9%
1930	758		−18.9%
1940	814		7.4%
1950	754		−7.4%
1960	723		−4.1%
1970	715		−1.1%
1980	805		12.6%
1990	726		−9.8%
2000	813		12.0%
2010	783		−3.7%
2020	689		−12.0%
Source: US Decennial Census

== Geography ==
According to the 2010 census, the township has a total area of 33.21 square miles (86.0 km^{2}), of which 32.96 square miles (85.4 km^{2}) (or 99.25%) is land and 0.25 square miles (0.65 km^{2}) (or 0.75%) is water.

Map of Wabash Township

=== Unincorporated towns ===
- Coal Creek
- Mackie

(This list is based on USGS data and may include former settlements.)

=== Major highways ===
- Indiana State Road 32
