= Kingman, Indiana =

Kingman
- Town
- Location of Kingman in Fountain County, Indiana.

- Kingman's location in Fountain County
- Coordinates: 39°57′59″N 87°16′41″W
- Country: United States
- State: Indiana
- County: Fountain
- Township: Millcreek

Area
  - Total: 0.66 sq mi (1.71 km^{2})
  - Land: 0.66 sq mi (1.71 km^{2})
  - Water: 0 sq mi (0.00 km^{2})
- Elevation: 702 ft (214 m)

Population (2020)
  - Total: 559
  - Density: 847/sq mi (327.2/km^{2})
- Time zone: UTC-5 (EST)
  - Summer (DST): UTC-5 (EST)
- ZIP code: 47952
- Area code: 765
- FIPS code: 18-39798
- GNIS feature ID: 2397017

Kingman is a town in Millcreek Township, Fountain County, Indiana, United States. As of the 2020 census, Kingman had a population of 559.

== History ==
The Kingman post office was established in 1886. Kingman was incorporated as a town in 1900 at which time it was merged with the nearby rival village of Fountainville.

== Geography ==
Kingman is located on State Road 234, about two miles west of U.S. Route 41.

According to the 2010 census, Kingman has a total area of 0.82 square miles (2.12 km^{2}), all land.

== Demographics ==
Historical population
Census	Pop.	Note	%±
1910	535		—
1920	578		8.0%
1930	502		−13.1%
1940	549		9.4%
1950	509		−7.3%
1960	461		−9.4%
1970	530		15.0%
1980	566		6.8%
1990	561		−0.9%
2000	538		−4.1%
2010	511		−5.0%
2020	559		9.4%
U.S. Decennial Census

=== 2010 census ===
As of the census of 2010, there were 511 people, 209 households, and 134 families living in the town. The population density was 623.2 inhabitants per square mile (240.6/km^{2}). There were 245 housing units at an average density of 298.8 per square mile (115.4/km^{2}). The racial makeup of the town was 97.7% White, 0.4% from other races, and 2.0% from two or more races. Hispanic or Latino of any race were 1.4% of the population.

There were 209 households, of which 30.1% had children under the age of 18 living with them, 45.5% were married couples living together, 13.4% had a female householder with no husband present, 5.3% had a male householder with no wife present, and 35.9% were non-families. 32.5% of all households were made up of individuals, and 18.2% had someone living alone who was 65 years of age or older. The average household size was 2.41 and the average family size was 2.98.

The median age in the town was 38.7 years. 26.4% of residents were under the age of 18; 6.2% were between the ages of 18 and 24; 24.7% were from 25 to 44; 24.9% were from 45 to 64; and 17.8% were 65 years of age or older. The gender makeup of the town was 49.9% male and 50.1% female.

=== 2000 census ===
As of the census of 2000, there were 538 people, 218 households, and 136 families living in the town. The population density was 659.2 inhabitants per square mile (254.5/km^{2}). There were 237 housing units at an average density of 290.4 per square mile (112.1/km^{2}). The racial makeup of the town was 99.07% White and 0.93% Native American. Hispanic or Latino of any race were 0.19% of the population.

There were 218 households, out of which 28.4% had children under the age of 18 living with them, 49.5% were married couples living together, 10.1% had a female householder with no husband present, and 37.2% were non-families. 31.2% of all households were made up of individuals, and 15.6% had someone living alone who was 65 years of age or older. The average household size was 2.47 and the average family size was 3.17.

In the town, the population was spread out, with 27.3% under the age of 18, 11.2% from 18 to 24, 27.9% from 25 to 44, 17.8% from 45 to 64, and 15.8% who were 65 years of age or older. The median age was 35 years. For every 100 females, there were 101.5 males. For every 100 females age 18 and over, there were 90.7 males.

The median income for a household in the town was $28,438, and the median income for a family was $36,875. Males had a median income of $29,250 versus $22,273 for females. The per capita income for the town was $12,815. About 13.7% of families and 16.2% of the population were below the poverty line, including 27.3% of those under age 18 and 8.6% of those age 65 or over.

== Education ==
The town has a free lending library, the Kingman-Millcreek Public Library.
