= Veedersburg, Indiana =

Veedersburg
- Town
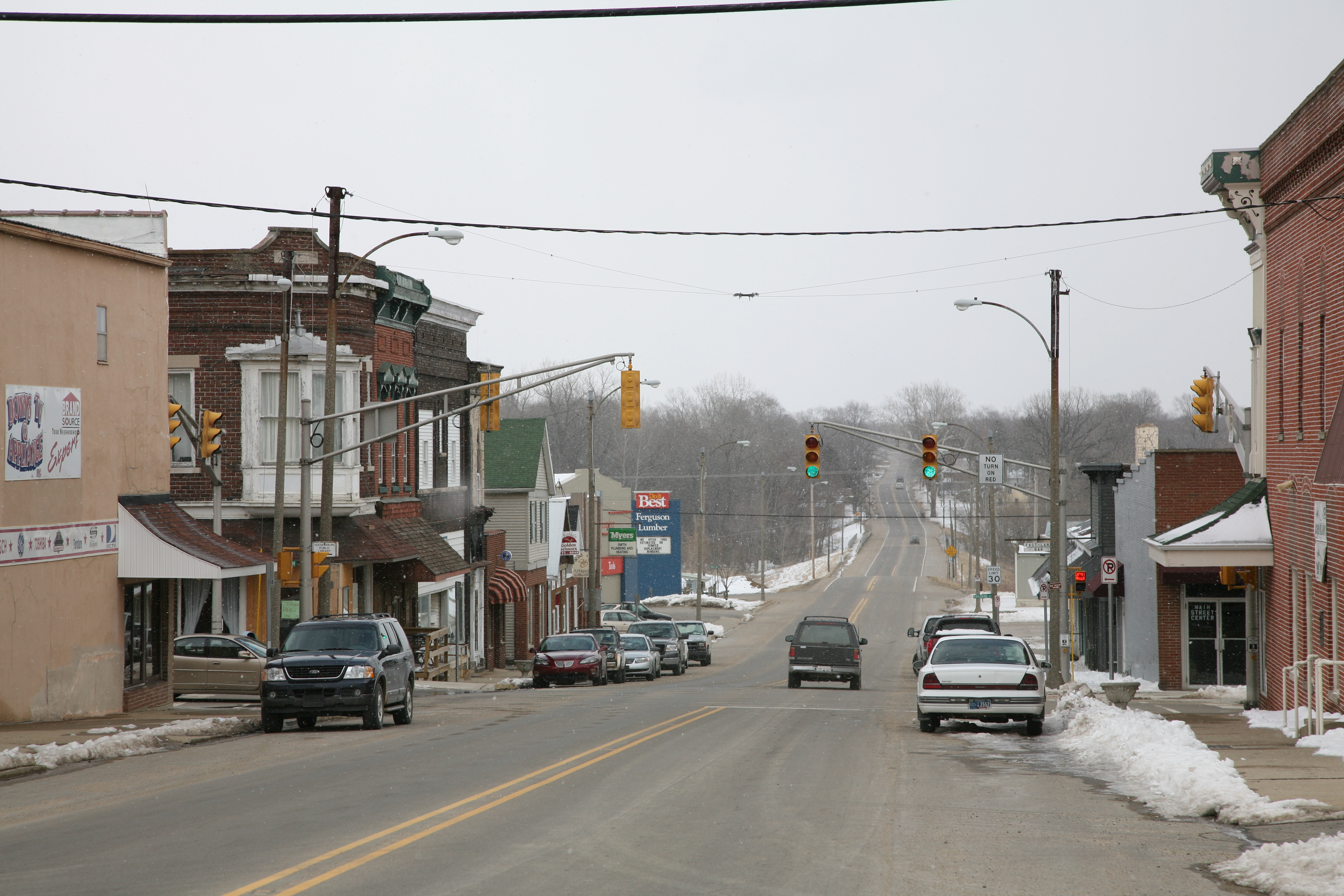
- Main St. and W 2nd (Route 136)

- Logo

- Location of Veedersburg in Fountain County, Indiana.

- Veedersburg's location in Fountain County
- Coordinates: 40°06′49″N 87°15′24″W
- Country: United States
- State: Indiana
- County: Fountain
- Township: Van Buren
- Platted: 1871
- Incorporated: 1872
- Named for: Peter S. Veeder

Area
  - Total: 3.00 sq mi (7.78 km^{2})
  - Land: 3.00 sq mi (7.76 km^{2})
  - Water: 0.0077 sq mi (0.02 km^{2})
- Elevation: 581 ft (177 m)

Population (2020)
  - Total: 2,098
  - Density: 700.4/sq mi (270.43/km^{2})
- Time zone: UTC-5 (Eastern (EST))
  - Summer (DST): UTC-4 (EDT)
- ZIP code: 47987
- Area code: 765
- FIPS code: 18-78740
- GNIS feature ID: 2397711
- Website: www.veedersburg.in.gov

Veedersburg is a town in Van Buren Township, Fountain County, Indiana, United States. As of the 2020 census, Veedersburg had a population of 2,098.

== History ==
Veedersburg is a newer name for the old town of Chambersburg, which was first settled by early inhabitants Jonathan Birch and John Colvert, on the north fork of Coal Creek in the spring of 1823. It was first located in Cain Township, but became part of the newer township of Van Buren in 1841. Veedersburg was founded in 1871. It was named for one of its founders, Peter S. Veeder. Veedersburg was incorporated as a town in 1872.

== Demographics ==
Historical population
Census	Pop.	Note	%±
1880	536		—
1890	930		73.5%
1900	1,638		76.1%
1910	1,757		7.3%
1920	1,580		−10.1%
1930	1,606		1.6%
1940	1,781		10.9%
1950	1,719		−3.5%
1960	1,762		2.5%
1970	2,198		24.7%
1980	2,261		2.9%
1990	2,192		−3.1%
2000	2,299		4.9%
2010	2,180		−5.2%
2020	2,098		−3.8%
U.S. Decennial Census

=== 2020 census ===
As of the 2020 census, Veedersburg had a population of 2,098. The median age was 42.3 years. 22.3% of residents were under the age of 18 and 18.6% of residents were 65 years of age or older. For every 100 females there were 102.1 males, and for every 100 females age 18 and over there were 100.7 males age 18 and over.

0.0% of residents lived in urban areas, while 100.0% lived in rural areas.

There were 885 households in Veedersburg, of which 28.2% had children under the age of 18 living in them. Of all households, 42.7% were married-couple households, 22.0% were households with a male householder and no spouse or partner present, and 24.9% were households with a female householder and no spouse or partner present. About 30.1% of all households were made up of individuals and 14.7% had someone living alone who was 65 years of age or older.

There were 960 housing units, of which 7.8% were vacant. The homeowner vacancy rate was 1.4% and the rental vacancy rate was 8.1%.

Racial composition as of the 2020 census
Race	Number	Percent
White	1,891	90.1%
Black or African American	8	0.4%
American Indian and Alaska Native	5	0.2%
Asian	5	0.2%
Native Hawaiian and Other Pacific Islander	1	0.0%
Some other race	101	4.8%
Two or more races	87	4.1%
Hispanic or Latino (of any race)	123	5.9%

=== 2010 census ===
As of the census of 2010, there were 2,180 people, 878 households, and 605 families living in the town. The population density was 801.5 inhabitants per square mile (309.5/km^{2}). There were 967 housing units at an average density of 355.5 per square mile (137.3/km^{2}). The racial makeup of the town was 94.8% White, 0.1% African American, 0.5% Native American, 0.1% Asian, 3.6% from other races, and 1.0% from two or more races. Hispanic or Latino of any race were 6.2% of the population.

There were 878 households, of which 33.0% had children under the age of 18 living with them, 49.1% were married couples living together, 13.1% had a female householder with no husband present, 6.7% had a male householder with no wife present, and 31.1% were non-families. 27.1% of all households were made up of individuals, and 11.5% had someone living alone who was 65 years of age or older. The average household size was 2.48 and the average family size was 2.94.

The median age in the town was 39.2 years. 25.2% of residents were under the age of 18; 7.9% were between the ages of 18 and 24; 24.9% were from 25 to 44; 25.7% were from 45 to 64; and 16.4% were 65 years of age or older. The gender makeup of the town was 48.6% male and 51.4% female.

=== 2000 census ===
As of the census of 2000, there were 2,299 people, 921 households, and 652 families living in the town. The population density was 846.4 inhabitants per square mile (326.8/km^{2}). There were 996 housing units at an average density of 366.7 per square mile (141.6/km^{2}). The racial makeup of the town was 98.91% White, 0.09% African American, 0.26% Native American, 0.39% from other races, and 0.35% from two or more races. Hispanic or Latino of any race were 2.74% of the population.

There were 921 households, out of which 35.3% had children under the age of 18 living with them, 56.1% were married couples living together, 9.7% had a female householder with no husband present, and 29.2% were non-families. 25.2% of all households were made up of individuals, and 13.2% had someone living alone who was 65 years of age or older. The average household size was 2.50 and the average family size was 2.96.

In the town, the population was spread out, with 27.3% under the age of 18, 7.1% from 18 to 24, 27.8% from 25 to 44, 22.8% from 45 to 64, and 15.0% who were 65 years of age or older. The median age was 36 years. For every 100 females, there were 97.0 males. For every 100 females age 18 and over, there were 92.8 males.

The median income for a household in the town was $35,944, and the median income for a family was $39,770. Males had a median income of $31,315 versus $21,285 for females. The per capita income for the town was $17,435. About 9.3% of families and 10.9% of the population were below the poverty line, including 13.8% of those under age 18 and 8.6% of those age 65 or over.

== Education ==
The town has a public library, a branch of the Covington-Veedersburg Public Library.

== Notable people ==
- Fred S. Purnell, U.S. representative from Indiana
