= John Murray Carnochan =

American surgeon

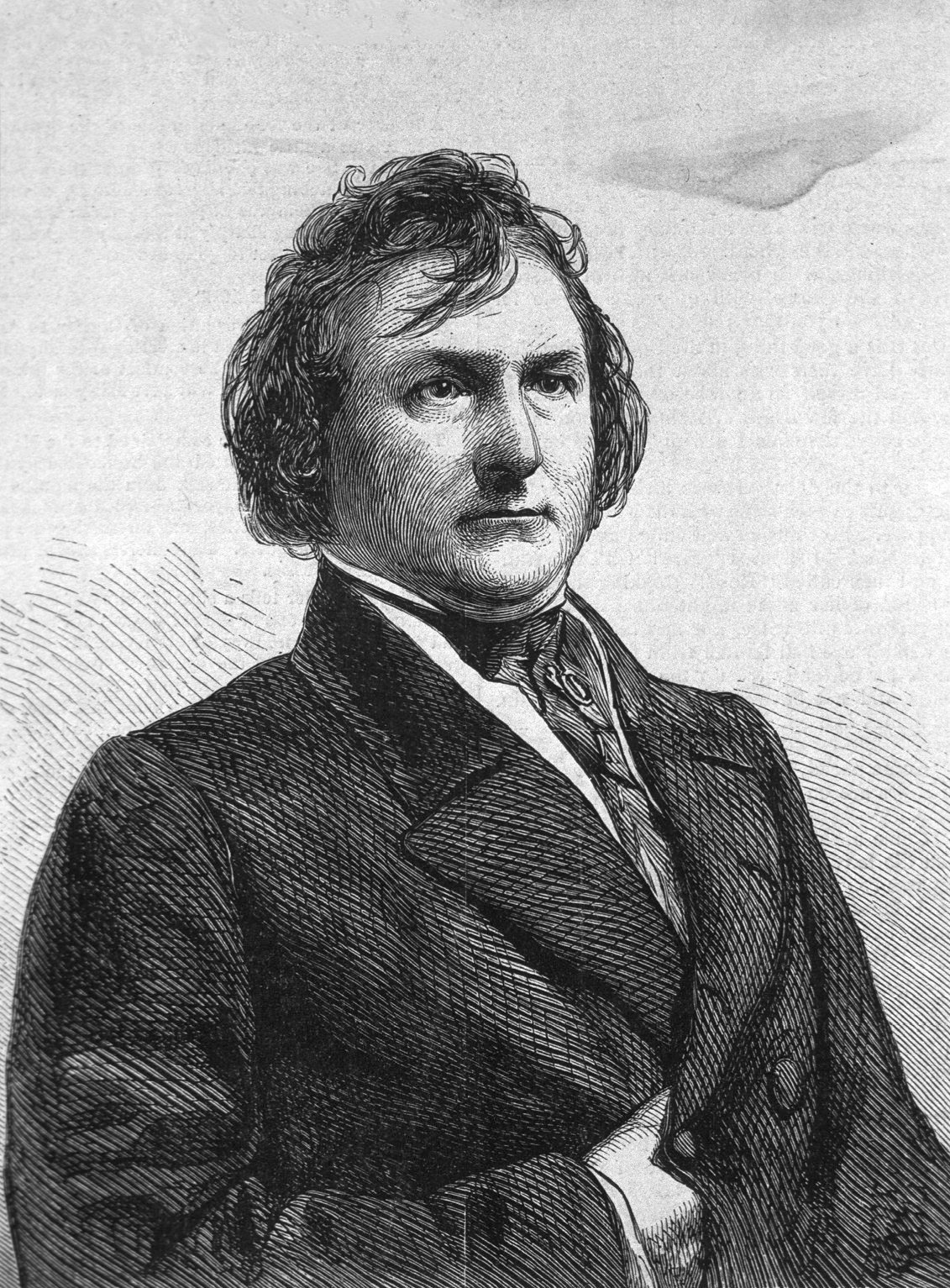
- Born: July 4, 1817; Savannah, Georgia, U.S.
- Died: October 28, 1887 (aged 70); New York City, U.S.
- Education: University of Edinburgh Medical School; Columbia College of Physicians and Surgeons
- Known for: trigeminal neuralgia
- Scientific career
- Fields: surgery

John Murray Carnochan (July 4, 1817 – October 28, 1887) was an American surgeon who performed the first successful neurosurgery for trigeminal neuralgia.

== Early life ==
Carnochan was born in Savannah, Georgia, on July 4, 1817. He was taken to Scotland, his father's native land, in early boyhood and attended, but did not graduate, from the University of Edinburgh Medical School. Moving to New York in 1834, he entered as a student the office of Valentine Mott and took his degree of M.D. from the Columbia College of Physicians and Surgeons in New York.

== Career ==
Devoting himself with ardor to the study of anatomy, he acquired special distinction in that field and gave lectures to private classes. In 1841, he again visited Europe, where he passed several years attending clinical lectures of the principal hospitals of Paris, London and Edinburgh. In 1847, he began practice in New York and in a short time his steadiness of nerve and boldness as an operator, gave him a high reputation as a surgeon. He later served during the war and for many years was professor of surgery of the New York Medical College. Although he was known for a dictatorial temper and consequently was on bad terms with his colleagues, he received liberal fees, wrote numerous technical monographs and died in fame.

Soon after beginning the practice of surgery in New York City, Carnochan attained a high reputation on account of his success in operations never before attempted. In 1852 he severed and tied the femoral artery, effecting a cure in an exaggerated case of nutrition (elephantiasis arabrum). The same year he removed an entire lower jaw, with both condyles.

In 1854, he removed the entire ulna, and also the entire radius. In 1856, he cut down and removed the entire trunk of the second branch of the fifth pair of cranial nerves, the nerve being cut from the infra-orbital foramen to the foramen rotundum, at the base of the skull, involving an operation through the malar bone. The removal of this nerve had been decided upon to secure relief in a chronic case of neuralgia. It was entirely successful, and made the bold and accurate operator famous throughout the world. In 1851 he was appointed professor of surgery in the New York Medical College. He occupied other professional appointments, including that of surgeon-in-chief to the State Immigrant Hospital. He published Congenital Dislocations (1850) and Contributions to Operative Surgery and Surgical Pathology (1860, 1877–86). His professional activity continued almost to the day of his death; so in September 1887, a month before he died, he attended the International Medical Congress at Washington and read two papers.

== Personal life ==
He married Estelle Morris (1838–1922), a daughter of Major-General William Walton Morris who commanded at Fort McHenry in Baltimore, Maryland, during the U.S. Civil War. She was a great-granddaughter of Lewis Morris, signer of the United States Declaration of Independence. Together, they were the parents of:

- Harriet Frances Putnam Carnochan (1857–1905), who married Thomas William Ludlow III (1857–1894), the eldest son of Thomas W. Ludlow Jr., in 1879.
- Mary Morris Carnochan (1859–1892), who married J. Lawrence Aspinwall (1854–1936), an architect with Renwick, Aspinwall and Russell.
- Estelle Phebe Carnochan (1863–1889), who died unmarried.
- Lillian Murray Carnochan (1864–1949), who married Livingston Crosby (1864–1919), nephew of Clarkson F. Crosby and grandson of Henry A. Livingston.
- Gouverneur Morris Carnochan (1865–1915), who married Mathilda Grosvenor Goodridge (1869–1905).

Carnochan died of apoplexy on October 28, 1887, at his home, 14 East 16th Street in New York City. After a funeral at his home conducted by The Rev. Dr. William Reed Huntington of Grace Church, he was buried at the Morris family cemetery, St. Ann's Episcopal Church Cemetery in the Bronx. His widow died in New York City, on December 9, 1922, aged 84.

=== Descendants ===
Through his eldest daughter, he was the grandfather of Julia Elektra Ludlow (1879–1920), who married Richard Mortimer Young in 1901; and Thomas Ludlow (1881–1929), who married Harriet Danforth Browne in 1904; Lewis Walton Morris (b. 1884), who married Harriet McKain in 1914; and Mary Alida Gouverneur Ludlow (b. 1893), who married William Meredith Ashley, a grandson of James Mitchell Ashley (parents of U.S. Representative Thomas William Ludlow Ashley), in 1917.

Through his son Gouverneur, he was the grandfather of John Murray Carnochan, Frederic Grosvenor Carnochan (1891–1952), an ethnologist and explorer, and Gouverneur Morris Carnochan (1892–1943) (who was father of Gouverneur Morris Carnochan Jr., Eleanor Carnochan, and W. B. Carnochan).
