= Mary Hannah Krout =

American journalist (1851–1927)

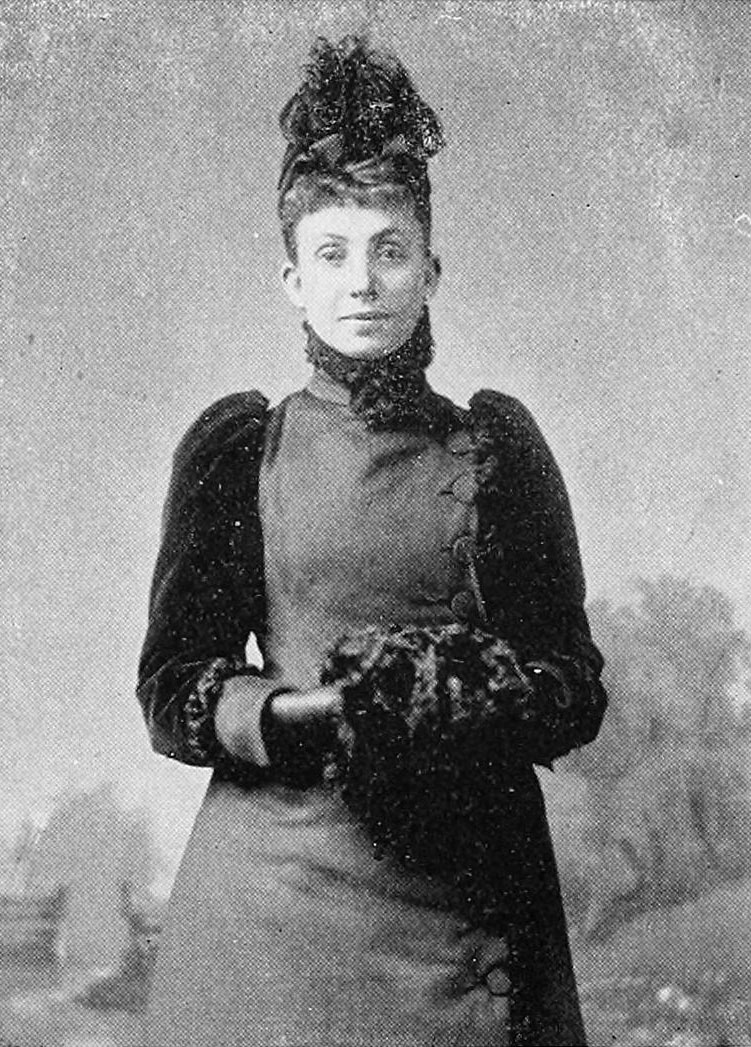
- Born: November 3, 1851; Crawfordsville, Indiana, US
- Died: May 31, 1927 (aged 75); Crawfordsville, Indiana, US
- Resting place: Oak Hill Cemetery, Crawfordsville, Indiana
- Occupations: Journalist and writer

Mary Hannah Krout (November 3, 1851 – May 31, 1927) was an American journalist, author, and advocate for women's suffrage.

== Early years and education ==
Mary Hannah Krout was born November 3, 1851, in Crawfordsville, Indiana, to Robert Kennedy and Caroline VanCleve (Brown) Krout. She attended a subscription school in Crawfordsville and then a public school. While still in school, she had several poems published, including "Little Brown Hands," which was widely reprinted and even incorporated into grade school readers.

== Career ==
She soon began her speaking career, addressing a Lafayette audience on women's suffrage. She taught for over a decade and began writing for newspapers. She got a job with the Crawfordsville Journal in 1879 and became the associate editor in 1881. She became editor of the Terre Haute Express in 1882.

In 1888, she moved to Chicago. She wrote, "In 1888 I came to Chicago. I was willing to do anything in the line of newspaper work only to gain a foothold. I was confident of my ability to work my way up to the tiptop of my desires. Finally I obtained a position as society reporter on the Chicago Inter-Ocean." For 10 years Krout was on the staff of the Chicago Inter-Ocean, serving as its staff correspondent in Hawaii during the revolution in 1893, and furnishing special data subsequently for the United States Department of State. She was also staff correspondent in London from 1895 to 1898, then went to China for a syndicate of representative newspapers specially to investigate the commercial relations of China and the United States.

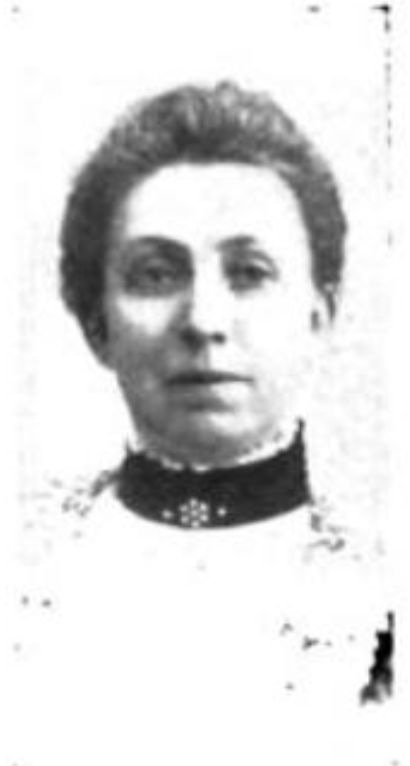
Krout in 1906

In 1907, Krout visited Australia for a second time, lecturing on American political and economic conditions and writing a series of articles for the Sydney and Auckland press on American topics. Later she engaged in miscellaneous literary work, and lectured on literary and other topics. According to Indiana Authors and their Books (1944), "Always, when the opportunity offered, she lectured on women's suffrage–in the States, in England, in New Zealand New Zealand, in China, in Hawaii."

== Selected works ==
- Hawaii and a Revolution (1898)
- Alice in the Hawaiian Islands (1899)
- A Looker-on in London (1899)
- Two Girls in China (1900)
- Memoirs of Bernice Pauahi Bishop (1909)
- Reminiscences of Mary S. Rice (1908)
- Platters and Pipkins (1908)
- The Coign of Vantage (1909)

She also assisted Susan Wallace with the completion of Lew Wallace's Autobiography following his death in 1905. It was published in 1906, a year before Mrs. Wallace died.

== Family ==
Her younger sister Caroline Virginia Krout was also a noted author.
