= William W. Morris =

American soldier and career officer (1801–1865)

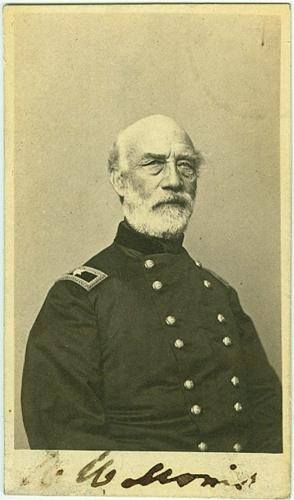
- Born: August 31, 1801; Ballston Spa, New York, US
- Died: December 11, 1865 (aged 64); Fort McHenry, Maryland, US
- Military career
- Allegiance: United States of America
- Branch: United States Army; Union Army
- Service years: 1820–1865
- Rank: Colonel; Brevet Brigadier General; Brevet Major General (posthumous)
- Unit: 4th U.S. Artillery Regiment
- Commands: 2nd U.S. Artillery Regiment
- Conflicts: Arickaree Expedition; Second Seminole War; Battle of Wahoo Swamp; Mexican–American War; Battle of Palo Alto; Battle of Resaca de la Palma; Third Seminole War; Bleeding Kansas; American Civil War

William Walton Morris Jr. (August 31, 1801 – December 11, 1865) was an American soldier and a career officer in the United States Army. He served as a colonel and brevet brigadier general in the Regular Army (United States), with Union Army service during the American Civil War (1861–1865). Morris served as a brigade commander primarily in charge of the defense of Fort McHenry and Baltimore Harbor. He had several brief periods in command of VIII Corps and of the Middle Department, which almost completely overlapped with each other.

== Early life ==
Morris was born in 1801 at Ballston Springs, New York. Morris was the second son of Sarah (née Carpenter) Morris and Lt. William Walton Morris Sr. (1760–1832), who served as aide-de-camp to Gen. Anthony Wayne. Among his siblings was Lewis Morris (who married Julia Hayes), Gouverneur Morris (who married Anna Maria de Camp), James Morris, Frances Morris (who married David Brooks), Anne Morris (who married Aquila G. Stout), and Arthur Breese Morris (who married Mary Bard).

His paternal grandparents were Lewis Morris, a signer of the United States Declaration of Independence, and Mary (née Walton) Morris, herself a granddaughter of prominent merchant William Walton. Among his large extended family was paternal uncle Richard Valentine Morris, aunt Helena Magdalena Morris (wife of U.S. Senator John Rutherfurd).

== Military training and service ==
He was appointed as a cadet in the United States Military Academy at West Point, New York, on March 17, 1815, at age fourteen. Morris graduated last out of 30 cadets in the class of 1820.

After graduation, Morris was promoted to second lieutenant, 6th United States Infantry Regiment, July 1, 1820. He initially served on the frontier in Iowa. Promoted to first lieutenant in 1823, Morris commanded the artillery in the Arickaree Expedition. Returning from the frontier, Morris attended the artillery school at Fort Monroe, Virginia, from 1823 to 1824 and transferred to the 4th U.S. Artillery Regiment in 1824. Morris served in various garrison positions until 1836, when he was promoted to captain, 4th Artillery.

He fought in the Second Seminole War, including the Battle of Wahoo Swamp, receiving a brevet major appointment for gallant conduct. During the Mexican–American War, Morris served as Major of the Artillery Battalion of the "Army of Occupation" and fought at the Battle of Palo Alto and Battle of Resaca de la Palma. Returning to the United States in 1848, Morris was promoted to major, 4th Artillery and served in various garrison and frontier positions. In early 1861, he was stationed at Fort Ridgely, Minnesota.

=== U.S. Civil War ===
On April 25, 1861, Morris was transferred to Fort McHenry, Baltimore, Maryland. On May 14, 1861, Morris was promoted to lieutenant colonel of the 4th Artillery Regiment in the Regular United States Army, followed by a promotion to colonel of the 2nd U.S. Artillery Regiment on November 1, 1861. On April 30, 1862, President Abraham Lincoln nominated Morris for appointment to the grade of brevet brigadier general, Regular United States Army, for "meritorious services", to rank from June 9, 1862, and the United States Senate confirmed the appointment on June 9, 1862.

Morris served as a brigade commander primarily in charge of the defense of Baltimore Harbor from July 22, 1862, and served both in the Middle Department and its military organization, the VIII Corps, under Maj. Gen. Robert C. Schenck, Brig. Gen. Henry H. Lockwood, and Maj. Gen. Lew Wallace. Morris temporarily commanded the VIII Corps and, for the most part simultaneously, the Middle Department (with the date of assumption or relinquishment of command of the department, if different, shown as the date assumed or relinquished in parentheses following the corps command dates): March 12, 1863, to March 22, 1863 (relinquished department command March 20, 1863); August 7, 1863, to August 31, 1863 (assumed department command August 10, 1863); September 22, 1863, to September 28, 1863; and, February 1, 1865, to April 19, 1865 (assumed department command January 30, 1865).

== Personal life ==
In January 1833, Morris was married to Mary Alexander Ritchie (1815–1880), the daughter of Hugh Williamson Ritchie and Esther (née Alexander) Ritchie. Her maternal grandfather was Major Archibald Alexander, who was a prisoner on the prison ship HMS Jersey during the Revolutionary War. Together, they were the parents of:

- William Gouverneur Morris (1833–1884), who studied at the Harvard Law School and later became a Union Officer. In 1880, Morris was appointed a special agent for the U.S. Treasury Department in Alaska, soon after he was appointed Collector of Customs in Sitka, Alaska.
- Estelle Morris (1838–1922), who married Dr. John Murray Carnochan (1817–1887).
- Gouverneur Morris (1841–1865), who volunteered under Col. Peter A. Porter in the 8th New York Regiment, and later in the Marine Corps.
- Arthur Morris (1843–1892), who married Adelaide Bettner.
- Anne Ritchie Morris (1845–1910), who married Col. Joseph Gales Ramsay (1843–1899), a son of Gen. George D. Ramsay.

Morris died on December 11, 1865, at Fort McHenry in Baltimore, Maryland at age 64. He was buried at St. Ann's Episcopal Church graveyard in the Bronx.

=== Posthumous awards ===
On April 16, 1866, President Andrew Johnson nominated Morris for posthumous appointment as a brevet major general, for "Faithful and meritorious Services during the Rebellion", in the Regular United States Army to rank from December 10, 1865, and the United States Senate confirmed the appointment on May 4, 1866.
