= The Blacherne =

Apartment building in Indiana, US

- Blacherne
- U.S. National Register of Historic Places
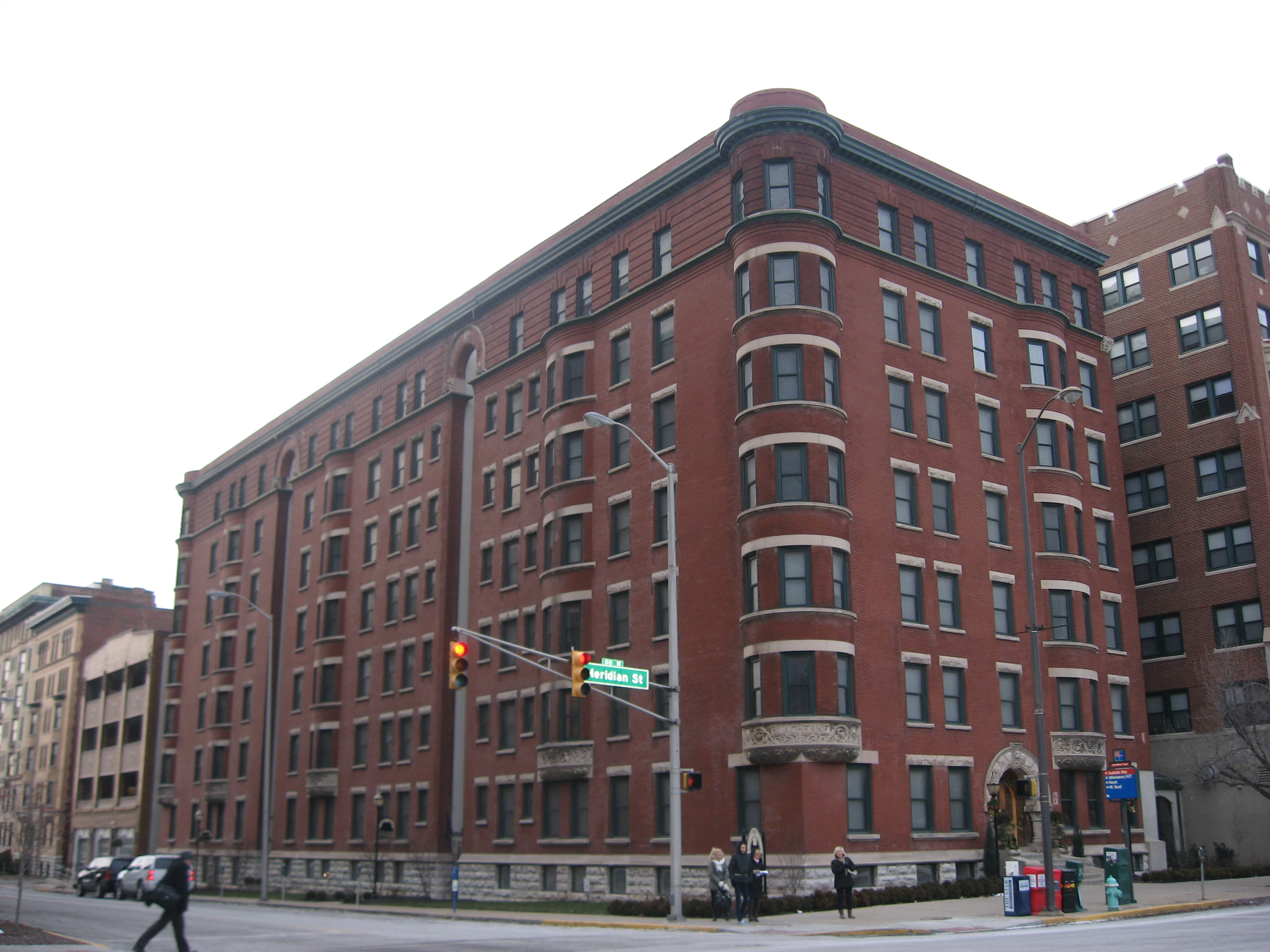
- The Blacherne, January 2010

- Location within Indianapolis Location within Indiana Location within the United States
- Location: 402 N. Meridian St., Indianapolis, Indiana
- Coordinates: 39°46′22″N 86°9′29″W
- Area: less than one acre
- Built: 1895
- MPS: Apartments and Flats of Downtown Indianapolis TR
- NRHP reference No.: 83000058
- Added to NRHP: September 15, 1983

The Blacherne is a historic apartment building located in Indianapolis, Indiana, United States. It was built in 1895 and is a large seven-story, 6 bay by 15 bay, red pressed brick building on a limestone foundation. It features two circular projecting bays at the corners and a semicircular limestone Romanesque Revival style entry portal.

The building was constructed by Indiana native Lew Wallace with the royalties from his best selling novel Ben Hur. The building is named after the palace in Wallace's novel The Prince of India; or, Why Constantinople Fell (1893). He maintained a residence in the structure until his death.

It was listed on the National Register of Historic Places in 1983.

== Gallery ==
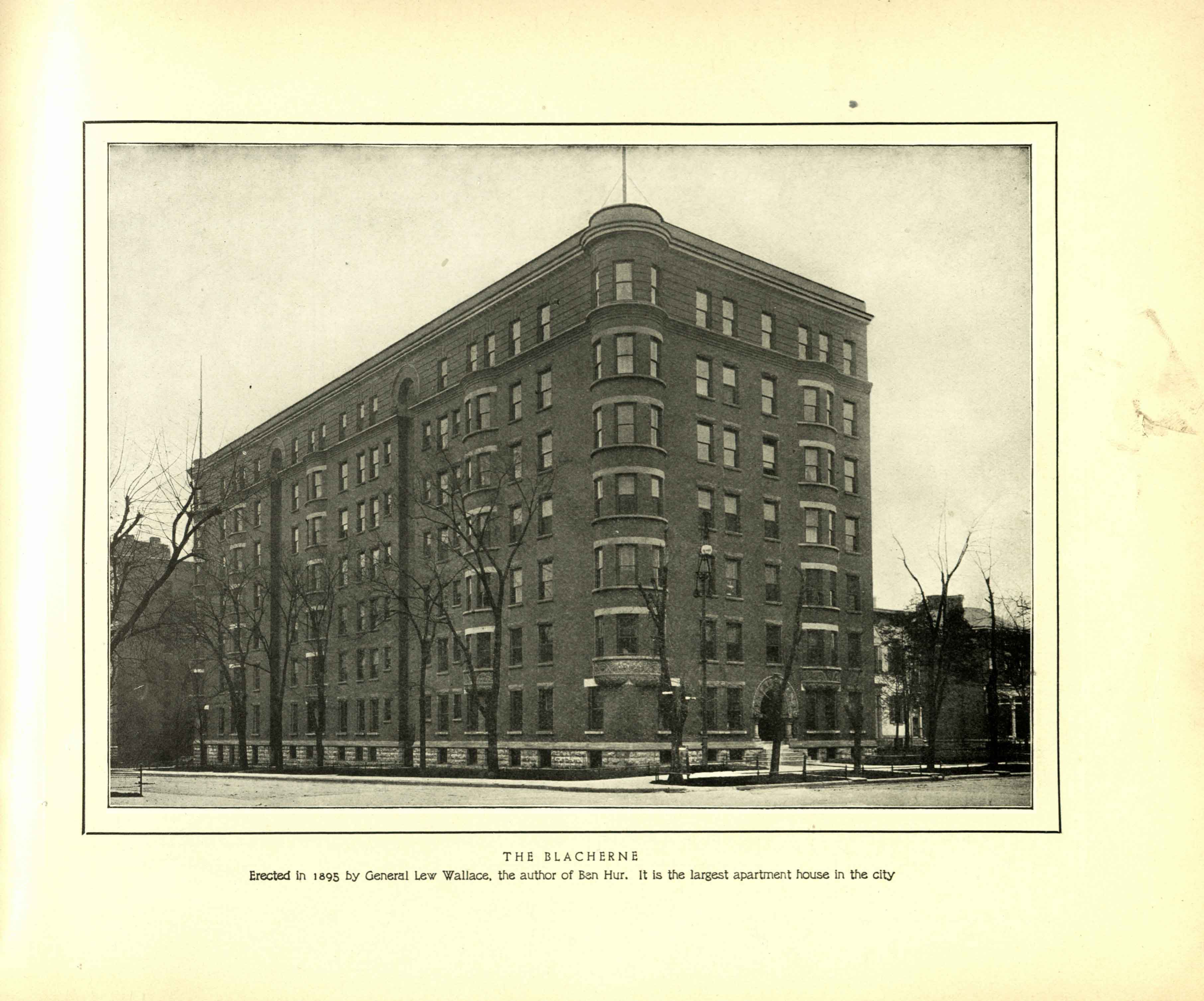
The Blancherne in 1904

== See also ==
- Apartments and Flats of Downtown Indianapolis Thematic Resources
- National Register of Historic Places listings in Center Township, Marion County, Indiana
- General Lew Wallace Study & Museum: Blacherne Apartments and Blachernae Palace
