= Lew Wallace =

American general, politician, and author (1827–1905)

Lewis Wallace
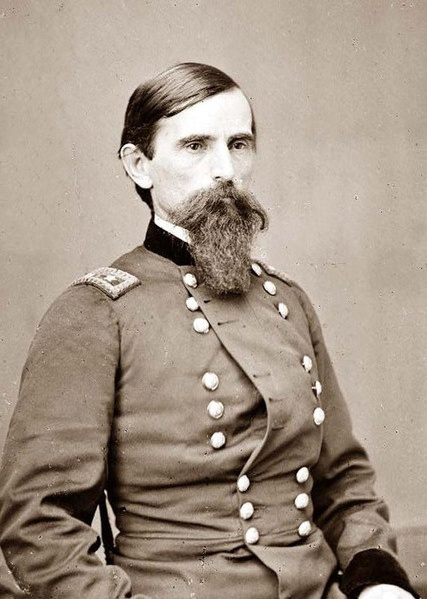
- Wallace c. 1865

10th Governor of New Mexico Territory
- In office September 29, 1878 – March 9, 1881
- Appointed by: Rutherford B. Hayes
- Preceded by: Samuel Beach Axtell
- Succeeded by: Lionel Allen Sheldon

United States Minister to the Ottoman Empire
- In office September 6, 1881 – May 15, 1885
- President: James A. Garfield; Chester A. Arthur; Grover Cleveland
- Preceded by: James Longstreet
- Succeeded by: Samuel S. Cox

Personal details
- Born: April 10, 1827 Brookville, Indiana, U.S.
- Died: February 15, 1905 (aged 77) Crawfordsville, Indiana, U.S.
- Resting place: Oak Hill Cemetery, Crawfordsville
- Party: Whig (before 1847); Free Soil (1848); Democratic (1848–1861); Republican (from 1861)
- Spouse: Susan Arnold Elston (m. 1852)
- Children: 1
- Nickname: "Savior of Cincinnati"

Military service
- Allegiance: United States; Union; Mexico
- Branch/service: United States Army; Union Army; Mexican Army
- Years of service: 1846–1847, 1861–1865
- Rank: Major General
- Commands: 11th Indiana Infantry; 3rd Division, Army of the Tennessee; VIII Corps
- Battles/wars: Mexican–American War; American Civil War; Raid on Romney; Battle of Fort Donelson; Battle of Shiloh; Siege of Corinth; Defense of Cincinnati; Battle of Monocacy

Lewis Wallace (April 10, 1827 – February 15, 1905) was an American lawyer, Union general in the American Civil War, governor of New Mexico Territory, politician, diplomat, artist, inventor, and author from Indiana. Among his novels and biographies, Wallace is best known for his historical adventure story, Ben-Hur: A Tale of the Christ (1880), a bestselling novel that has been called "the most influential Christian book of the nineteenth century."

Wallace's military career included service in the Mexican–American War and the American Civil War. He was appointed Indiana's adjutant general and commanded the 11th Indiana Infantry Regiment. Wallace, who attained the rank of major general, participated in the Battle of Fort Donelson, the Battle of Shiloh, and the Battle of Monocacy. He also served on the military commission for the trials of the Lincoln assassination conspirators, and presided over the trial of Henry Wirz, the Confederate commandant of the Andersonville prison camp.

Wallace resigned from the United States Army in November 1865 and briefly served as a major general in the Mexican Army, before returning to the United States. He was appointed governor of New Mexico Territory (1878–1881) and served as U.S. minister to the Ottoman Empire (1881–1885). He retired to his home in Crawfordsville, Indiana, where he continued writing until his death in 1905.

== Early life and education ==
Lewis "Lew" Wallace was born on April 10, 1827, in Brookville, Indiana. He was the second of four sons born to Esther French Wallace (née Test) and David Wallace. Lew's father, a graduate of the United States Military Academy in West Point, New York, left the military in 1822 and moved to Brookville, where he established a law practice and entered Indiana politics. David served in the Indiana General Assembly and later as the state's lieutenant governor, and governor, and as a member of Congress. Lew Wallace's maternal grandfather was circuit court judge and Congressman John Test.

In 1832 the family moved to Covington, Indiana, where Lew's mother died from tuberculosis on July 14, 1834. In December 1836, David married nineteen-year-old Zerelda Gray Sanders Wallace, who later became a prominent suffragist and temperance advocate. In 1837, after David's election as governor of Indiana, the family moved to Indianapolis.

Lew began his formal education at the age of six at a public school in Covington, but he much preferred the outdoors. Wallace had a talent for drawing and loved to read, but he was a discipline problem at school. In 1836, at the age of nine, Lew joined his older brother in Crawfordsville, Indiana, where he briefly attended the preparatory school division of Wabash College, but soon transferred to another school more suitable for his age. In 1840, when Wallace was thirteen, his father sent him to a private academy at Centerville, Indiana, where his teacher encouraged Lew's natural affinity for writing. Wallace returned to Indianapolis the following year.

Sixteen-year-old Lew went out to earn his own wages in 1842, after his father refused to pay for more schooling. Wallace found a job copying records at the Marion County clerk's office and lived in an Indianapolis boardinghouse. He also joined the Marion Rifles, a local militia unit, and began writing his first novel, The Fair God, but it was not published until 1873. Wallace said in his autobiography that he had never been a member of any organized religion, but he did believe "in the Christian conception of God".

By 1846, at the start of the Mexican–American War, the nineteen-year-old Wallace was studying law at his father's law office, but left that pursuit to establish a recruiting office for the Marion Volunteers in Indianapolis. He was appointed a second lieutenant, and on June 19, 1846, mustered into military service with the Marion Volunteers (also known as Company H, 1st Indiana Volunteer Infantry). Wallace rose to the position of regimental adjutant and the rank of first lieutenant while serving in the army of Zachary Taylor, but Wallace personally did not participate in combat. Wallace was mustered out of the volunteer service on June 15, 1847, and returned to Indiana, where he intended to practice law. After the war, Wallace and William B. Greer operated a Free Soil newspaper, The Free Soil Banner, in Indianapolis.

== Marriage and family ==
In 1848 Wallace met Susan Elston at the Crawfordsville home of Henry S. Lane, Wallace's former commander during the Mexican War. Susan was the daughter of Major Isaac Compton Elston, a wealthy Crawfordsville merchant, and Maria Akin Elston, whose family were Quakers from upstate New York. Susan accepted Wallace's marriage proposal in 1849, and they were married in Crawfordsville on May 6, 1852. The Wallaces had one son, Henry Lane Wallace, who was born on February 17, 1853.

== Early law and military career ==
Wallace was admitted to the bar in February 1849, and moved from Indianapolis to Covington, Indiana, where he established a law practice. In 1851 Wallace was elected prosecuting attorney of Indiana's 1st congressional district, but he resigned in 1853 and moved his family to Crawfordsville. Wallace continued to practice law and was elected as a Democrat to a two-year term in the Indiana Senate in 1856. From 1849 to 1853, his office was housed in the Fountain County Clerk's Building.

While living in Crawfordsville, Wallace organized the Crawfordsville Guards Independent Militia, later called the Montgomery Guards. During the winter of 1859–60, after reading about elite units of the French Army in Algeria, Wallace adopted the Zouave uniform and their system of training for the group. The Montgomery Guards later formed the core of his first military command, the 11th Indiana Volunteer Infantry, during the American Civil War.

== Civil War service ==
Wallace, a staunch supporter of the Union, became a member of the Republican party, and began his full-time military career soon after the Confederate attack on Fort Sumter, South Carolina, on April 12, 1861. Indiana's governor, the Republican Oliver P. Morton, asked Wallace to help recruit Indiana volunteers for the Union army. Wallace, who also sought a military command, agreed to become the state's adjutant general on the condition that he would be given command of a regiment of his choice. Indiana's quota of six regimental units was filled within a week, and Wallace took command of the 11th Indiana Volunteer Infantry Regiment, which was mustered into the Union army on April 25, 1861. Wallace received his formal commission as a colonel in the Union army the following day.

On June 5, 1861, Wallace went with the 11th Indiana to Cumberland, Maryland, and on June 12, the regiment won a minor battle at Romney, Virginia, (in present-day West Virginia). The rout boosted morale for Union troops and led to the Confederate evacuation of Harpers Ferry, West Virginia, on June 18. On September 3, 1861, Wallace was promoted to brigadier general of United States Volunteers and given command of a brigade.

=== Forts Henry and Donelson ===
On February 4 and 5, 1862, prior to the advance against Fort Henry, Union troops under the command of Brig. Gen. Ulysses S. Grant and a flotilla of Union ironclads and timberclad gunboats under the command of Flag Officer Andrew Hull Foote made their way toward the Confederate fort along the Tennessee River in western Tennessee. Wallace's brigade, which was attached to Brig. Gen. Charles F. Smith's division, was ordered to occupy Fort Heiman, an uncompleted Confederate fort across the river from Fort Henry. Wallace's troops secured the deserted fort and watched the Union attack on Fort Henry from their hilltop position. On February 6, after more than an hour of bombardment from the Union gunboats, Confederate Brig. Gen. Lloyd Tilghman surrendered Fort Henry to Foote.

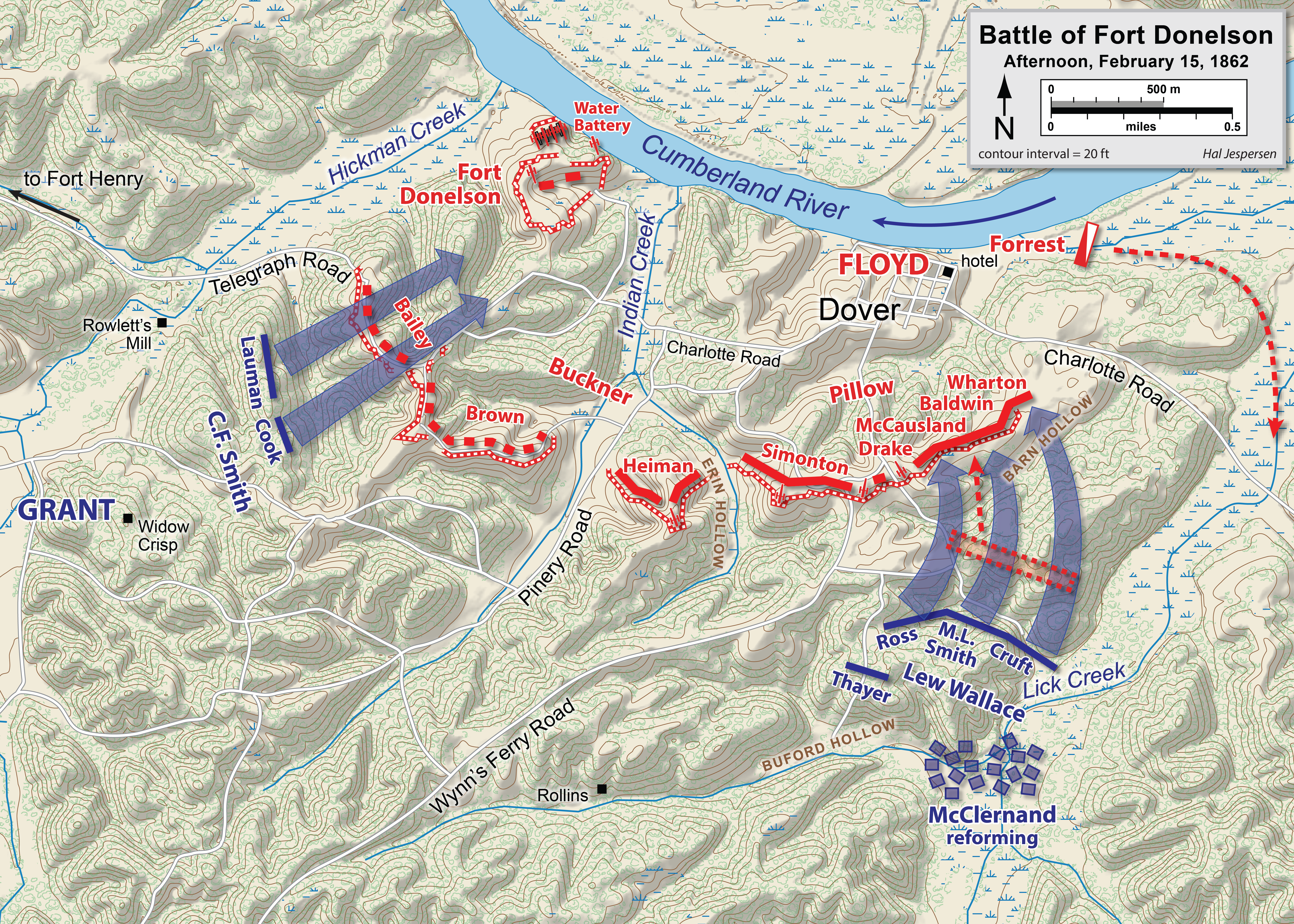
Map showing Wallace's counterattack at Fort Donelson (1862)

Grant's superior, Maj. Gen. Henry W. Halleck, was concerned that Confederate reinforcements would try to retake the two forts when the Union troops moved overland toward Fort Donelson, so Wallace was left in command at Fort Henry to keep the forts secure. Displeased to have been left behind, Wallace prepared his troops to move out at a moment's notice. The order came at midnight on February 13. Wallace arrived in front of Fort Donelson the following day and was placed in charge of the newly forming 3rd Division. Many of the men in the division were untested reinforcements. Wallace's three brigades took up position in the center of the Union line, facing Fort Donelson.

During the fierce Confederate assault on February 15, and with Grant's absence from the battlefield, Wallace acted on his own initiative to send Cruft's brigade to reinforce the beleaguered division of Brig. Gen. John A. McClernand, despite orders from Grant to hold his position and prevent the enemy from escaping and without Grant's authority to take the offensive. With the Confederates continuing to advance, Wallace led a second brigade to the right and engaged the Confederates with infantry and artillery. Wallace's decision stopped their forward movement and was key in stabilizing a defensive line for the Union troops. After the Confederate assault had been checked, Wallace led a counterattack that regained the lost ground on the Union right. On March 21, 1862, McClernand, C. F. Smith, and Wallace were promoted to major general in that order for their efforts. Wallace, who was age thirty-four at the time of his promotion, became the youngest major general in the Union army.

=== Shiloh ===
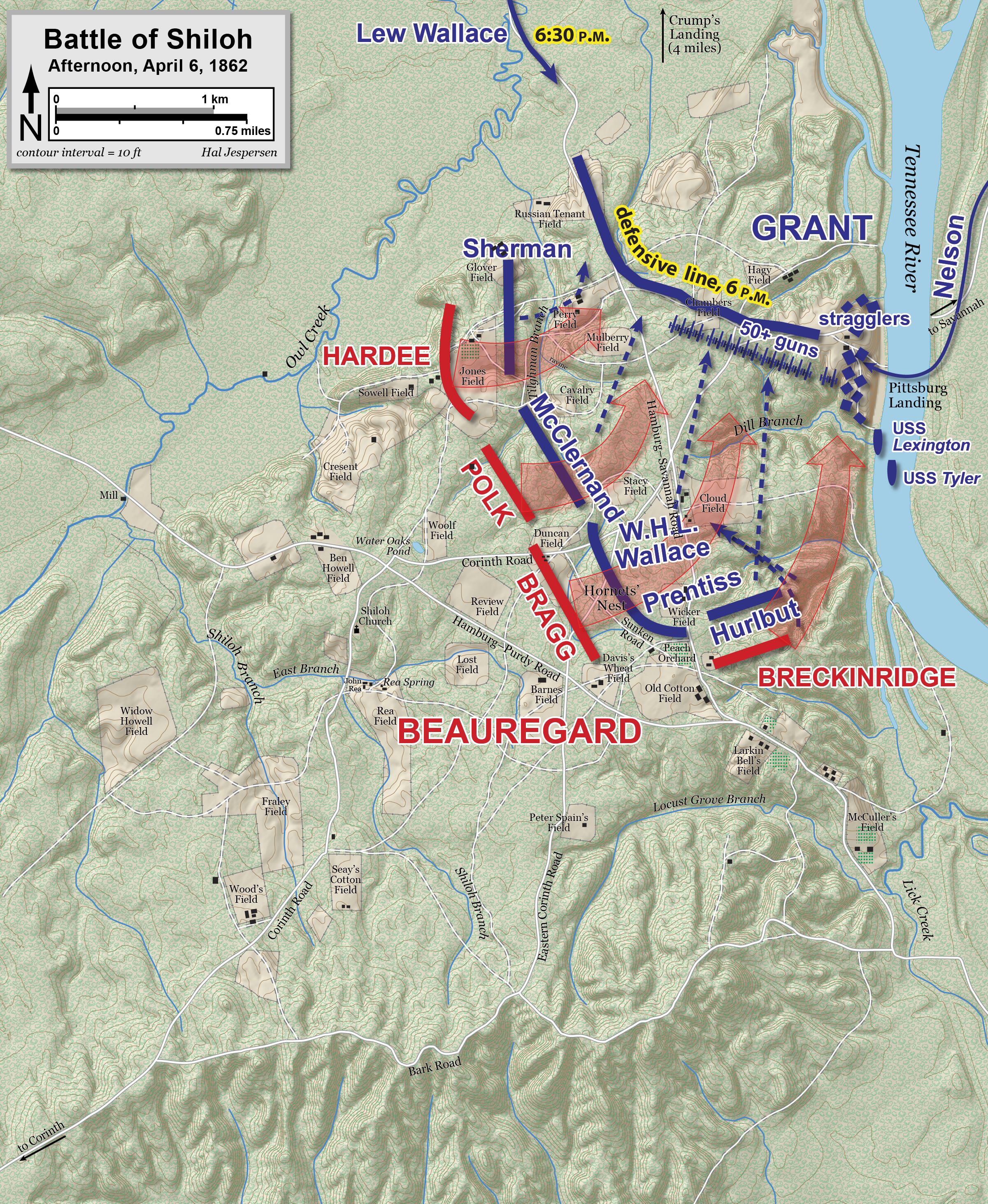
Map of the Battle of Shiloh, afternoon of April 6, 1862

Wallace's most controversial command came at the Battle of Shiloh, where he continued as the 3rd Division commander under Grant. What was to become a long-standing controversy developed around the contents of Wallace's written orders on April 6, the 3rd Division's movements on the first day of battle, and its late arrival on the field. The next day, the reinforcement by Wallace's division and the juncture of Maj. Gen. Don Carlos Buell's Army of the Ohio permitted the Union forces to push back the enemy all day long to gain the victory.

Prior to the battle, Wallace's division had been detached and was encamped near Crump's Landing, five miles downstream from Pittsburg Landing and the bulk of Grant's army. Wallace's orders were to guard the Union's rear and to cover the road leading west to Bethel Station, Tennessee, where railroad lines led to Corinth, Mississippi, 20 miles (32 km) to the south. To protect the road from Crump's Landing and Bethel Station, Wallace sent Col. John M. Thayer's 2nd Brigade to Stoney Lonesome, 3 miles (4.8 km) west of Crump's Landing, and the 3rd Brigade, commanded by Col. Charles Whittlesey to Adamsville, 5.5 miles (8.9 km) west of Crump's Landing. Col. Morgan L. Smith's 1st Brigade remained with Wallace at Crump's Landing, 5 miles (8.0 km) north of Pittsburg Landing.

Around 5 a.m. on April 6, 1862, the Battle of Shiloh began in which Grant's army at Pittsburg Landing was surprised and began to be pushed back by a sudden attack from the Confederate Army under Gen. Albert Sidney Johnston. Grant, who heard the early morning artillery fire, took a steamboat upriver from his headquarters at Savannah, Tennessee, briefly stopping at Crump's Landing, where he gave Wallace orders to wait, but be ready to move in any direction. Grant proceeded to Pittsburg Landing, where he arrived around 9:00 or 9:30 a.m. Grant's new orders to Wallace, which arrived between 11 and 11:30 a.m., were given verbally to Grant's quartermaster, who transcribed them before they were delivered. The written orders were lost during the battle, so their exact wording cannot be confirmed; however, most eyewitness accounts agree that Grant ordered Wallace to join the right side of the Union army, presumably in support of Brig. Gen. William Tecumseh Sherman's 5th Division, which was encamped near Shiloh Church on the morning of April 6.

Knowledge of the area's roads played a critical role in Wallace's journey to the battlefield on April 6. In late March, after heavy rains made transportation difficult between Crump's Landing and Pittsburg Landing, Wallace's men had opened a route to Pittsburg Landing along Shunpike road, which connected to a road near Sherman's camp. Brig. Gen. W. H. L. Wallace's men at Pittsburg Landing opened the River Road (also known as the Hamburg-Savannah Road), a route farther east.

Of the two main routes that Wallace could use to move his men to the front, he chose the Shunpike road, the more direct route to reach the right of Sherman's division near Shiloh Church. The day before the battle, Wallace wrote a letter to W. H. L. Wallace, recommending this route to reinforce the 3rd Division. Lew Wallace and his staff maintained after the battle that Grant's order did not specify Pittsburg Landing as their destination, and that it did not specify which route the 3rd Division was ordered to take. However, Grant claimed in his memoirs that he had ordered Wallace to take the route nearest to the river to reach Pittsburg Landing. Historians are divided, with some stating that Wallace's explanation is the most logical.

After a second messenger from Grant arrived around noon with word to move out, Wallace's division of approximately 5,800 men began their march toward the battlefield. Between 2 and 2:30 p.m., Col. William R. Rowley, sent by Grant, rode to where Wallace's division first was; only a supply wagon departing the scene remained. Riding further, Rowley found Wallace along the Shunpike road at the head of his column near Clear Creek, positioned on high ground. He informed Wallace that Sherman had been forced back from Shiloh Church and was fighting closer to the river, near Pittsburg Landing. Grant had ordered Rowley to "tell him to come up at once" and that "if he should require a written order of you, you will give it to him at once". Rowley pulled Wallace off to the side and warned him of the danger that lay just ahead, exclaiming, "Don't you know that Sherman has been driven back? Why, the whole army is within half a mile of the river, and it's a question if we are not all going to be driven into it." Wallace, stunned by the news, sent his cavalry ahead to assess the situation, and upon returning, it had confirmed Rowley's claim. The Union army had been pushed back so far that Wallace was heading toward the rear of the advancing Southern troops.

Wallace briefly considered attacking the Confederates, but abandoned the idea. Instead he made a controversial decision to countermarch his first two brigades along the Shunpike road, follow a crossroads to the River Road, and then move south to Pittsburg Landing. Rather than realigning his troops, so that the rear guard would be in the front, Wallace countermarched his column to maintain their original order, keeping his artillery in position to support the Union infantry on the field. After the time-consuming maneuver was completed, Wallace's troops returned to the midpoint on the Shunpike road, crossed east over a path to the River Road, and followed it south to join Grant's army on the field. Progress was slow due to the atrocious road conditions and the countermarch. Wallace's division arrived at Pittsburg Landing about 6:30 p.m., after having marched about 14 miles (23 km) in nearly seven hours over roads that had been left in terrible conditions by recent rainstorms and previous Union marches. They gathered at the battlefield at dusk, about 7 p.m., with the fighting basically over for the day, and took up a position on the right of the Union line.

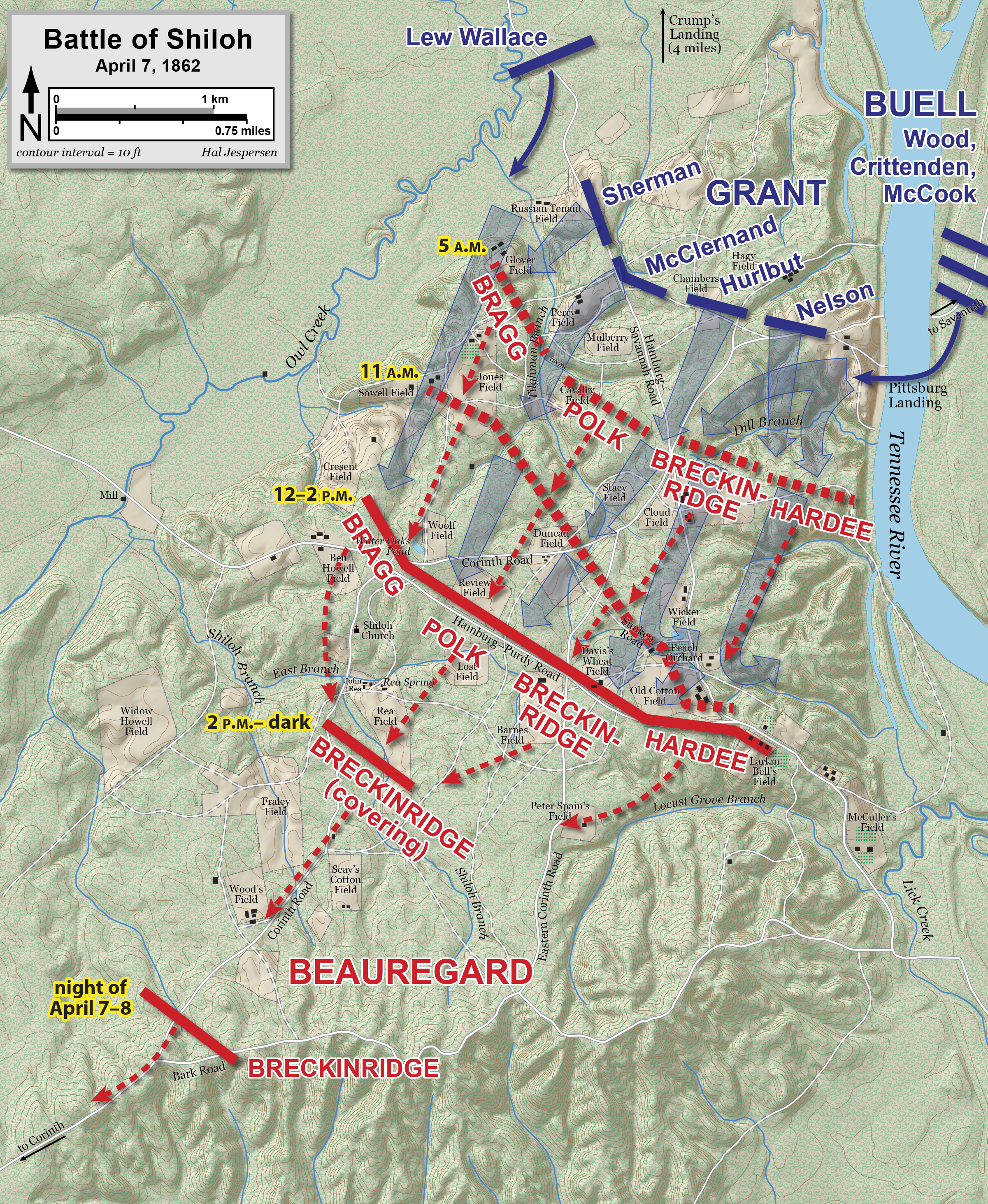
Map of the Battle of Shiloh, April 7, 1862

The next day, April 7, Wallace's division held the extreme right of the Union line. Two of Wallace's batteries with the aid of a battery from the 1st Illinois Light Artillery were the first to attack at about 5:30 a.m. Sherman's and Wallace's troops helped force the Confederates to fall back, and by 3 p.m. the Confederates were retreating southwest, toward Corinth.

Historian Timothy B. Smith noted that on the second day Wallace's division sustained far fewer casualties (296) than any of Buell's three divisions. The number of casualties does not always show the effectiveness of troops. Wallace had his soldiers lie down when they were under fire, which minimized casualties. He also maneuvered his division so that it repeatedly turned the Confederate left flank. Wallace advanced his division at 6:30 am, reached the south side of Tilghman Branch about 8:00 am, and occupied a commanding ridge by 9:00 am, all with little opposition. Here he paused to wait for Union troops to appear on his left. Up to this point, Wallace's movements were slow. Once Grant's and Buell's soldiers reached the Confederate main line of defense they were stopped in heavy fighting. Noting that the Confederate left did not reach as far as Owl Creek, Wallace wheeled his division to outflank the enemy line. Finding Wallace's troops to their left and rear, the left-hand Confederate brigade hurriedly fell back. This unhinged the entire line and the Confederate troops soon retreated to a second position around noon. At around 1:00 pm, Wallace worked a few regiments around the Confederate left flank, forcing their withdrawal to a third position. After the Confederates left the battlefield, Wallace's division went the farthest south of the Union forces, but he pulled his troops back before going into camp that evening.

=== Shiloh controversy ===
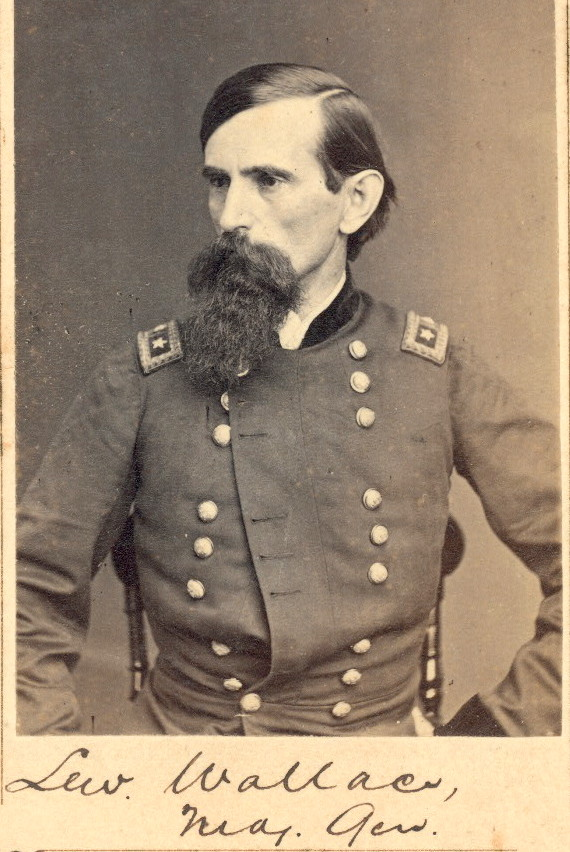
Maj. Gen. Lew Wallace

At first, the battle was viewed by the North as a victory; however, on April 23, after civilians began hearing news of the surprise and resulting high number of casualties, the Lincoln administration asked the Union army for further explanation. Grant, who was accused of poor leadership at Shiloh, and his superior, Halleck, tried to place blame on Wallace by asserting that his failure to follow orders and the delay in moving up his division on April 6 had nearly cost the Union the battle.

After hearing reports that Wallace refused to obey anything but written orders, an angry Grant asserted that a division general "ought to take his troops to wherever the firing may be, even without orders".

On April 30, 1862, Halleck reorganized his army and removed Wallace and McClernand from the front lines, placing both of them in reserve, with McClernand commanding.

Wallace's reputation and career as a military leader suffered a significant setback from controversy over Shiloh. He spent the remainder of his life trying to resolve the accusations and change public opinion about his role in the battle. On March 14, 1863, Wallace wrote a letter to Halleck that provided an official explanation of his actions. He also wrote Grant several letters and met with him in person more than once in an attempt to vindicate himself. On August 16, 1863, Wallace wrote Sherman for advice on the issue. Sherman urged Wallace to be patient and not to request a formal inquiry. Although Sherman brought Wallace's concerns to Grant's attention, Wallace was not given another active duty command until March 1864.

For many years Grant stood by his original version of the orders to Wallace. As late as 1884, when Grant wrote an article on Shiloh for The Century Magazine that appeared in its February 1885 issue, he maintained that Wallace had taken the wrong road on the first day of battle. After W. H. L. Wallace's widow gave Grant a letter that Lew Wallace had written to her husband the day before the battle (the one indicating his plans to use the Shunpike road to pass between Shiloh and his position west of Crump's Landing), Grant changed his mind. Grant wrote a letter to the editors at Century, which was published in its September 1885 issue, and added a note to his memoirs to explain that Wallace's letter "modifies very materially what I have said, and what has been said by others, about the conduct of General Lew Wallace at the battle of Shiloh." While reaffirming that he had ordered Wallace to take the River Road, Grant stated that he could not be sure the exact content of Wallace's written orders, since his verbal orders were given to one of his aides and transcribed.

Grant's article in the February 1885 issue of Century became the basis of his chapter on Shiloh in his memoirs, which were published in 1886, and influenced many later accounts of Wallace's actions on the first day of battle. Grant acknowledged in his memoirs: "If the position of our front had not changed, the road which Wallace took would have been somewhat shorter to our right than the River road." Wallace's account of the events appeared in his autobiography, which was published posthumously in 1906. Despite his later fame and fortune as the writer of Ben-Hur, Wallace continued to lament: "Shiloh and its slanders! Will the world ever acquit me of them? If I were guilty I would not feel them as keenly."

=== The Kentucky Campaign and Defense of Cincinnati ===
Following his loss of a field command, Wallace returned to Indiana and spent time at his retreat on the Kankakee River. It was there that he received a telegram from Governor Morton to take command of an Indiana regiment in the Department of the Ohio to help with the defense of Kentucky during Gen. Braxton Bragg's incursion into Kentucky and to report to Louisville. Presenting himself with his new regiment to Brig. Gen. Jeremiah Boyle in Louisville, Boyle was uncomfortable having a superior officer under his command. Boyle ordered Wallace to take his regiment to Lexington, take command of the hastily created Army of Kentucky, and march to the relief of the men at Cumberland Gap. Wallace began a defensive plan that would place his army on the north side of the Kentucky River, about 15 miles from Boonesboro to defend against the advance of Maj. Gen. Edmund Kirby Smith's army from the direction of Cumberland Gap. He had all of the locks on the river in the area opened to flood the fords, confiscated every boat in the area and moved them to the north bank, and the position was secured by sheer limestone cliffs on his flanks. But Wallace was soon relieved of command by Maj. Gen. William "Bull" Nelson, who took command of the Army of Kentucky on August 24 on orders from Maj. Gen. Horatio Wright, commander of the Department of the Ohio. Nelson altered Wallace's defensive plan, and engaged Smith's Confederate Army of Kentucky at the Battle of Richmond on August 30, and was soundly defeated.

Wallace and his staff started a return to Cincinnati to await any orders. Wright sent a telegram ordering Wallace to return to Lexington to take command of what remained of the Army of Kentucky. Traveling by train from Cincinnati, Wallace received another telegram from Wright when he arrived at Paris, Kentucky, ordering him to remain in Cincinnati. He immediately returned to Cincinnati and began vigorous efforts for the defense of Cincinnati.

Upon his arrival in the city, Wallace immediately began organizing the defenses of Cincinnati, Ohio and the Kentucky cities of Covington and Newport south of Cincinnati. Wallace ordered martial law, set a strict curfew, closed all businesses, and began putting male citizens to work on rifle pits, felling trees for makeshift abatis and clear fields of fire, and improving the 1861 earthwork defenses. It was during this hasty defensive preparation that the Black Brigade of Cincinnati was formed, by Wallace's orders.

In response to calls from Ohio's Governor David Tod, approximately 15,000 so-called "Squirrel Hunters"—untrained volunteers who carried outdated equipment—reported to Cincinnati. Additionally, newly created regiments from Indiana and Ohio were rushed to Cincinnati; most had not completed their training.

Because the arriving regiments could not be ferried quickly enough across the Ohio River, Wallace ordered the construction of a pontoon bridge, which was constructed using coal barges in under 48 hours.

While at Lexington, Smith gave Brig. Gen. Henry Heth permission to make a "demonstration" on Cincinnati, granting him approximately 8,000 men. Heth moved within a few miles of Fort Mitchel and exchanged skirmish fire with men from the 101st Ohio Infantry, 103rd Ohio Infantry, and 104th Ohio Infantry on September 10–11, then returned to Lexington on September 12, 1862.

Wallace's leadership during the defense of Cincinnati earned him the nickname by local newspapers as the "Savior of Cincinnati". On September 12, Wallace telegraphed Wright from Cincinnati: "The skedaddle is complete; every sign of a rout. If you say so I will organize a column of 20,000 men to pursue to-night." Instead, Wright relieved Wallace of a field command.

=== Other military assignments ===
Wallace was ordered to take command of Camp Chase, a prisoner-of-war camp at Columbus, Ohio, where he remained until October 30, 1862. His instructions there were to recruit and train Confederate prisoners of war for U.S. Army service (also known as "Galvanized Yankees") to aid in the Sioux Uprising. The Battle of Wood Lake on September 23 essentially ended the uprising and Wallace was again without a command.

The following month, Wallace was placed in charge of the five-member commission Buell Military Commission to investigate Buell's conduct in response to the Confederate invasion of Kentucky. The commission criticized Buell for his retreat, but it did not find him disloyal to the Union. When the commission's work was completed on May 6, 1863, Wallace returned to Indiana to wait for a new command. In mid-July 1863, while Wallace was home, he helped protect the railroad junction at North Vernon, Indiana, from Confederate general John Hunt Morgan's raid into southern Indiana.

=== Monocacy ===
Wallace's most notable service came on Saturday, July 9, 1864, at the Battle of Monocacy part of the Valley Campaigns of 1864. Although Confederate Lt. Gen. Jubal A. Early and an estimated 15,000 troops defeated Wallace's troops at Monocacy Junction, Maryland, forcing them to retreat to Baltimore, the effort cost Early a potential chance to capture Washington, D.C. Wallace's men were able to delay the Confederate advance toward Washington for an entire day, giving the city time to organize its defenses. Early arrived in Washington at around noon on July 11, two days after defeating Wallace at Monocacy, the northernmost Confederate victory of the war, but Union reinforcements had already arrived at Fort Stevens to repel the Confederates and force their retreat to Virginia.

Wallace, who had returned to active duty on March 12, 1864, assumed command of VIII Corps, which was headquartered in Baltimore. On July 9, a combined Union force of approximately 5,800 men under Wallace's command (mostly hundred days men from VIII Corps) and a division under James B. Ricketts from VI Corps encountered Confederate troops at Monocacy Junction between 9 and 10 a.m. Although Wallace was uncertain whether Baltimore or Washington, D.C., was the Confederate objective, he knew his troops would have to delay the advance until Union reinforcements arrived. Wallace's men repelled the Confederate attacks for more than six hours before retreating to Baltimore.

After the battle Wallace informed Halleck that his forces fought until 5 p.m., but the Confederate troops, which he estimated at 20,000 men, had overwhelmed them. When Grant learned of the defeat, he named Maj. Gen. E. O. C. Ord as Wallace's replacement in command of VIII Corps. On July 28, after officials learned how Wallace's efforts at Monocacy helped save Washington, D.C., from capture, he was reinstated as commander of VIII Corps. In Grant's memoirs, he praised Wallace's delaying tactics at Monocacy:

If Early had been but one day earlier, he might have entered the capital before the arrival of the reinforcements I had sent. ... General Wallace contributed on this occasion by the defeat of the troops under him, a greater benefit to the cause than often falls to the lot of a commander of an equal force to render by means of a victory.

=== Later military service ===
On January 22, 1865, Grant ordered Wallace to the Rio Grande in southern Texas to investigate Confederate military operations in the area. Although Wallace was not officially authorized to offer terms, he did discuss proposals for the surrender of the Confederate troops in the Trans-Mississippi Department. Wallace provided Grant with copies of his proposals and reported on the negotiations, but no agreement was made. Before returning to Baltimore, Wallace also met with Mexican military leaders to discuss the U.S. government's unofficial efforts to aid in expelling Maximilian's French occupation forces from Mexico.

Following President Lincoln's death on April 15, 1865, Wallace was appointed to the military commission that investigated the Lincoln assassination conspirators. The commission, which began in May, was dissolved on June 30, 1865, after all eight conspirators were found guilty. In mid-August 1865, Wallace was appointed head of an eight-member military commission that investigated the conduct of Captain Henry Wirz, the Confederate commandant in charge of the South's Andersonville prison camp. The court-martial which took nearly two months, opened on August 21, 1865. At its conclusion Wirz was found guilty and sentenced to death.

On April 30, 1865, Wallace accepted an offer to become a major general in the Mexican army, but the agreement, which was contingent upon his resignation from the U.S. Army, was delayed by Wallace's service on the two military commissions. Wallace tendered his resignation from the U.S. Army on November 4, 1865, effective November 30, and returned to Mexico to assist the Mexican army. Although the Juárez government promised Wallace $100,000 for his services, he returned to the United States in 1867 in deep financial debt.

After the war, Wallace became a companion of the Indiana Commandery of the Military Order of the Loyal Legion of the United States.

== Political and diplomatic career ==
Wallace returned to Indiana in 1867 to practice law, but the profession did not appeal to him, and he turned to politics. Wallace made two unsuccessful bids for a seat in Congress (in 1868 and 1870), and supported Republican presidential candidate Rutherford B. Hayes in the 1876 election. As a reward for his political support, President Hayes appointed Wallace as governor of the New Mexico Territory, where he served from August 1878 to March 1881. His next assignment came in March 1881, when President James A. Garfield appointed Wallace to an overseas diplomatic post in Constantinople as U.S. Minister to the Ottoman Empire. Wallace remained in this post until 1885.

=== Territorial governor of New Mexico ===
Wallace arrived in Santa Fe on September 29, 1878, to begin his service as governor of the New Mexico Territory during a time of lawless violence and political corruption. Wallace was involved in efforts to resolve New Mexico's Lincoln County War, a contentious and violent disagreement among the county's residents, and tried to end a series of Apache raids on territorial settlers. In 1880, while living at the Palace of the Governors in Santa Fe, Wallace also completed the manuscript for Ben-Hur: A Tale of the Christ.

On March 1, 1879, after previous efforts to restore order in Lincoln County had failed, Wallace ordered the arrest of those responsible for local killings. One of the outlaws was William Henry McCarty Jr. (alias William H. Bonney), better known as Billy the Kid. On March 17, 1879, Wallace secretly met with Bonney, who had witnessed the murder of a Lincoln County lawyer named Huston Chapman. Wallace wanted him to testify in the trial of Chapman's accused murderers, but Bonney wanted Wallace's protection from his enemies and amnesty for his earlier crimes. During their meeting, the pair arranged for Bonney to become an informant in exchange for a full pardon of his previous crimes. Wallace supposedly assured the Kid that he would be "scot free with a pardon in your pocket for all your misdeeds." On March 20, Bonney agreed to provide grand jury testimony against those involved in Chapman's murder. Wallace arranged for a "fake" arrest and Bonney's detention in a local jail to assure his safety. Bonney testified in court on April 14, as agreed. However, the local district attorney revoked Wallace's bargain and refused to set the outlaw free. After spending several weeks in jail, Bonney escaped and returned to his criminal ways, which included killing additional men. He was shot and killed on July 14, 1881, by Sheriff Pat Garrett, who had been appointed by local ranching interests who had tired of his rustling their herds. In the meantime, Wallace had resigned from his duties as territorial governor on March 9, 1881, and was waiting for a new political appointment.

On December 31, 2010, on his last day in office, then-Governor Bill Richardson of New Mexico declined a pardon request from Bonney's supporters, citing a "lack of conclusiveness and the historical ambiguity" over Wallace's promise of amnesty. Descendants of Wallace and Garrett were among those who opposed the pardon.

=== U.S. diplomat in the Ottoman Empire ===
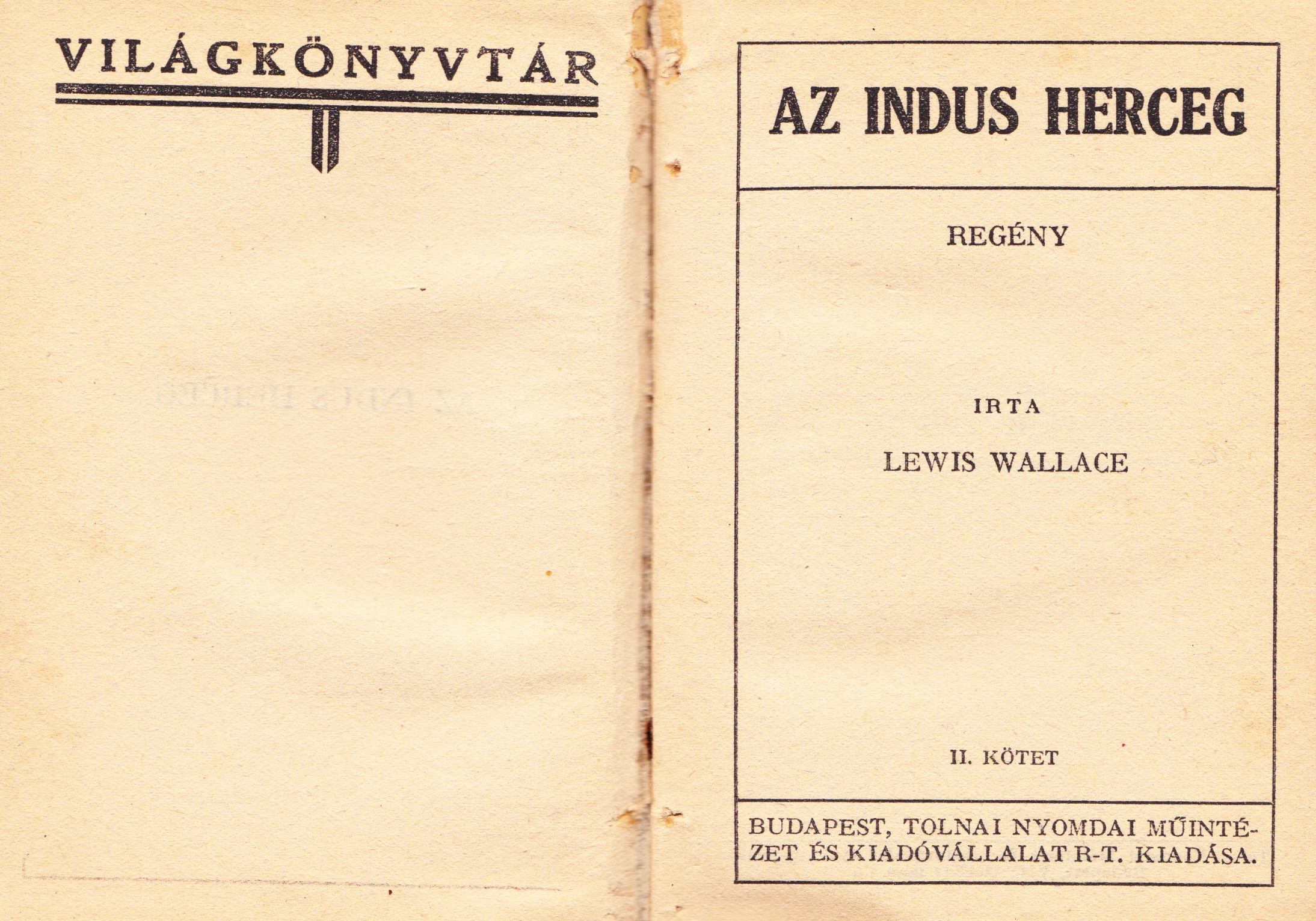
The Prince of India (Hungarian edition, 1930s)

On May 19, 1881, Wallace was appointed U.S. Minister to the Ottoman Empire in Constantinople (present-day Istanbul, Turkey). Wallace remained at the diplomatic post until 1885, and became a trusted friend of Sultan Abdul Hamid II. When a crisis developed between the Turkish and British governments over control of Egypt, Wallace served as an intermediary between the sultan and Lord Dufferin, the British ambassador. Although Wallace's efforts were unsuccessful, he earned respect for his efforts and a promotion in the U.S. diplomatic service.

In 1883, an editorial aimed at Wallace appeared in the newspaper Havatzelet (xiii. No. 6) titled "An American and yet a Despot". The editorial caused the Havatzelet to be suspended and its editor Israel Dov Frumkin to be imprisoned for forty-five days by order from Constantinople, directed to the pasha of the Mutasarrifate of Jerusalem. The incident that led to the editorial was the dismissal, made at Wallace's request, of Joseph Kriger, the Jewish secretary and interpreter to the pasha of Jerusalem. Wallace complained that Kriger had failed to receive him with the honor due to his rank, and refused to issue any apology for the alleged shortcoming. Havatzelet claimed that the proceeding was instigated by missionaries, whom Wallace strongly supported.

In addition to Wallace's diplomatic duties, which included protection of U.S. citizens and U.S. trade rights in the area, Wallace found time to travel and conduct historical research. Wallace visited Jerusalem and the surrounding area, a setting in his previous novel, Ben-Hur, and did research in Constantinople, the locale for The Prince of India; or, Why Constantinople Fell, which he began writing in 1887.

The election of Grover Cleveland, the Democratic candidate for president, ended Wallace's political appointment. He resigned from the U.S. diplomatic service on March 4, 1885. The sultan wanted Wallace to continue to work in the Ottoman Empire, and even made a proposal to have him represent Ottoman interests in England or France, but Wallace declined and returned home to Crawfordsville.

== Writing career ==
Wallace confessed in his autobiography that he took up writing as a diversion from studying law. Although he wrote several books, Wallace is best known for his historical adventure story, Ben-Hur: A Tale of the Christ (1880), which established his fame as an author.

In 1843, Wallace began writing his first novel, The Fair God; or, the Last of the 'Tzins, but it was not published until 1873. The popular historical novel, with Cortez's conquest of Mexico as its central theme, was based on William H. Prescott's History of the Conquest of Mexico. Wallace's book sold seven thousand copies in its first year. Its sales continued to rise after Wallace's reputation as an author was established with the publication of subsequent novels.

Wallace wrote the manuscript for Ben-Hur, his second and best-known novel, during his spare time at Crawfordsville, and completed it in Santa Fe, while serving as the territorial governor of New Mexico. Ben-Hur, an adventure story of revenge and redemption, is told from the perspective of a Jewish nobleman named Judah Ben-Hur. Because Wallace had not been to the Holy Land before writing the book, he began research to familiarize himself with the area's geography and its history at the Library of Congress in Washington, D.C., in 1873. Harper and Brothers published the book on November 12, 1880.

Ben-Hur made Wallace a wealthy man and established his reputation as an author. Sales were slow at first; only 2,800 copies were sold in the first seven months after its release, but the book became popular among readers around the world. By 1886, it was earning Wallace about $11,000 in annual royalties (equivalent to $290,000 in 2015 dollars), and provided Wallace's family with financial security. By 1889, Harper and Brothers had sold 400,000 copies and the book had been translated into several languages.

In 1900, Ben-Hur became the best-selling American novel of the 19th century, surpassing Harriet Beecher Stowe's Uncle Tom's Cabin. Amy Lifson, an editor for Humanities, identified it as the most influential Christian book of the 19th century. Others named it one of the best-selling novels of all time. At the time of Ben-Hur's one hundredth anniversary in 1980, it had never been out of print and had been adapted for the stage and several motion pictures. One historian, Victor Davis Hanson, has suggested that Ben-Hur drew from Wallace's life, particularly his experiences at Shiloh, and the damage it did to his reputation. The book's main character, Judah Ben-Hur, accidentally causes injury to a high-ranking Roman commander, for which he and his family suffer tribulations and calumny.

Wallace continued to write, but Ben-Hur remained his most successful work. Wallace considered The Prince of India; or, Why Constantinople Fell (1893) as his best novel. He also wrote a biography of President Benjamin Harrison, a fellow Hoosier and Civil War general, and The Wooing of Malkatoon (1898), a narrative poem. Wallace was writing his autobiography when he died in 1905. His wife Susan completed it with the assistance of Mary Hannah Krout, another author from Crawfordsville. It was published posthumously in 1906.

== Later years ==
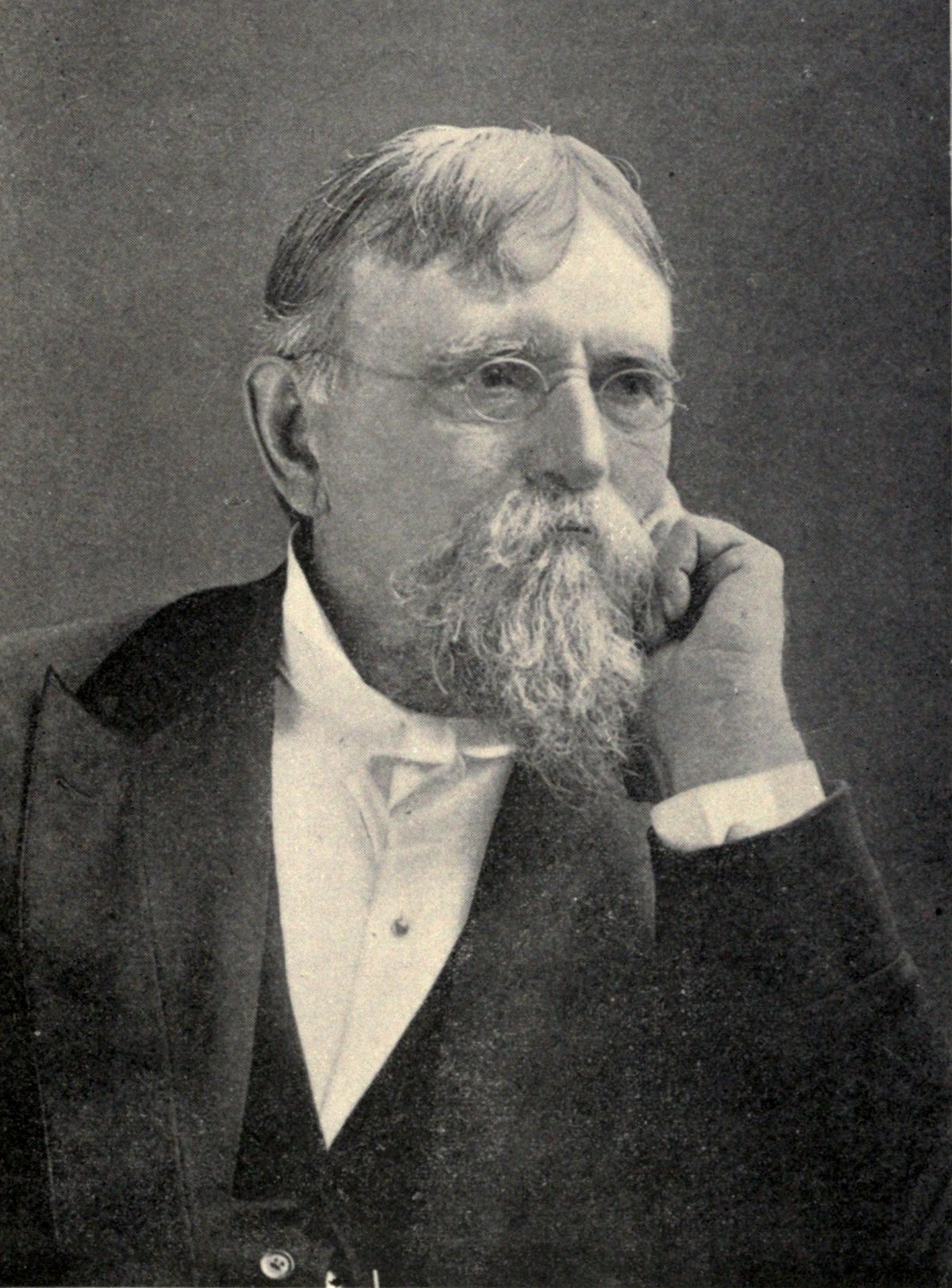
Lew Wallace in 1903

Wallace continued to write after his return from the Ottoman Empire. He also patented several of his own inventions, built a seven-story apartment building in Indianapolis, the Blacherne, and drew up plans for a private study at his home in Crawfordsville. Wallace remained active in veterans groups, including writing a speech for the dedication of the battlefield at the Chickamauga.

Wallace's elaborate writing study, which he described as "a pleasure-house for my soul", served as his private retreat. Now called the General Lew Wallace Study & Museum, it was built between 1895 and 1898, adjacent to his residence in Crawfordsville, and set in an enclosed park. The study along with three and one-half acres of its grounds were designated a National Historic Landmark in 1976. The property is operated as a museum, open to the public. Wallace had a moat on two sides of the Study and stocked it so he could fish from the back porch and a landing. In winter, he would fire up the coal furnace in the Study basement and fish from the windows. He loved fishing so much he invented and patented a special traveler's fishing pole. After just a few years he had the moat drained as it was negatively affecting the Study foundation and he worried about his grandchildren and neighborhood children falling into the water.

On April 5, 1898, at the outbreak of the Spanish–American War, Wallace, at age seventy-one, offered to raise and lead a force of soldiers, but the war office refused. Undeterred, he went to a local recruiting office and attempted to enlist as a private, but was rejected again, presumably because of his age.

Wallace's service at the Battle of Shiloh continued to haunt him in later life. The debate persisted in book publications, magazine articles, pamphlets, speeches, and in private correspondence. Wallace attended a reunion at Shiloh in 1894, his first return since 1862, and retraced his journey to the battlefield with veterans from the 3rd Division. He returned to Shiloh for a final time in 1901 to walk the battlefield with David W. Reed, the Shiloh Battlefield Commission's historian, and others. Wallace died before the manuscript of his memoirs was fully completed, and it is unknown whether he would have revised his final account of the battle.

== Death ==
Wallace died at home in Crawfordsville, on February 15, 1905, of atrophic gastritis. He was 77. Wallace is buried in Crawfordsville Oak Hill Cemetery.

== Legacy and honors ==
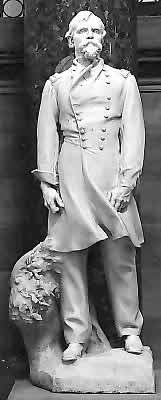
Wallace's statue in the U.S. Capitol

Wallace was a man of many interests and a lifelong adventure seeker, who remained a persistent, self-confident man of action. He was also impatient and highly sensitive to personal criticisms, especially those related to his command decisions at Shiloh. Despite Wallace's career in law and politics, combined with years of military and diplomatic service, he achieved his greatest fame as a novelist, most notably for his best-selling biblical tale, Ben-Hur.

Following Wallace's death, the State of Indiana commissioned the sculptor Andrew O'Connor to create a marble statue of Wallace dressed in a military uniform for the National Statuary Hall Collection in the United States Capitol. The statue was unveiled during a ceremony held on January 11, 1910. A bronze copy of the statue is installed on the grounds of Wallace's study in Crawfordsville.

Lew Wallace High School opened in 1926 at 415 West 45th Avenue in Gary, Indiana. On June 3, 2014, the Gary School Board voted 4 to 2 to close Lew Wallace, along with five other schools.

A Knights of Pythias lodge was established in Franklin, Indiana at the Masonic Home to be known as the General Lewis Wallace Lodge #2019.

== Popular culture ==
USL Indianapolis-based team The Indy Eleven pays homage to the 11th Regiment of Indiana Volunteers, which fought for the Union Army during the Civil War. The inspiration for the name came from Donna Schmink, the Collection Manager at the Indiana War Museum, who, when asked by team officials for ideas on a team name connected to Indiana history, suggested "the Eleventh" in honor of the regiment that valiantly fought under the initial direction of Colonel Lew Wallace.

=== Film and television ===
- Frank Reicher (uncredited) as General Lew Wallace in the film Billy the Kid (1930).
- Berton Churchill as Gov. Wallace in The Big Stampede (1932).
- Joe King (uncredited) as Governor Lew Wallace in Land Beyond the Law (1937).
- Robert H. Barrat as General Lew Wallace in The Kid from Texas (1950).
- Claude Stroud as Gen. Lew Wallace – New Mexico Governor in I Shot Billy the Kid (1950).
- Otis Garth (uncredited) as Gov. Lew Wallace in The Law vs. Billy the Kid (1954).
- Ralph Moody as Gen. Lew Wallace in Strange Lady in Town (1955).
- Dayton Lummis as Governor Wallace in Death Valley Days (TV series), episode "Shadows on the Window" (aired February 18, 1960).
- Robert Warwick as Governor Wallace in Law of the Plainsman (TV series), episode "Amnesty" (aired April 7, 1960).
- Cameron Mitchell as General Lew Wallace in The Andersonville Trial (TV), which aired May 17, 1970; an adaptation of the 1959 Broadway play by the same name.
- Jason Robards as Governor Wallace in Pat Garrett and Billy the Kid (1973).
- René Auberjonois as Gov. Lew Wallace in Longarm (TV film, 1988).
- Wilford Brimley as Gov. Lew Wallace in Billy the Kid (TNT film, 1989).
- Scott Wilson as Governor Lewis Wallace in the film Young Guns II (1990).
- Brian Merrick as Gen. Lew Wallace in No Retreat from Destiny: The Battle That Rescued Washington (2006 video).
- Bernard O'Bryan (actor/historian) as Gen. Lew Wallace in Lew Wallace: Shiloh Soldier, Ben-Hur Bard (2015)
- Anthony Lemke as Governor Lew Wallace in seasons 2–3 of the Western TV series, Billy the Kid (2023–2025)

== Published works ==
=== Novels ===
- The Fair God; or, The Last of the 'Tzins: A Tale of the Conquest of Mexico (Boston: James R. Osgood and Company, 1873.)
- Ben-Hur: A Tale of the Christ (New York: Harper and Brothers, 1880.)
  - The First Christmas from Ben-Hur (New York: Harper and Brothers, 1899.)
- The Boyhood of the Christ (New York: Harper and Brothers, 1888.)
- The Prince of India; or, Why Constantinople Fell (New York: Harper and Brothers, 1893.) Two volumes.

=== Poem ===
- The Wooing of Malkatoon in 14 Cantos (New York: Harper and Brothers, 1898.)

=== Play ===
- Commodus: An Historical Play (Crawfordsville, IN: privately published by the author, 1876.) Revised and reissued in the same year.

=== Non-fiction ===
- Life of Gen. Ben Harrison (Philadelphia: Hubbard Brothers, 1888.)
- Life and Public Services of Hon. Benjamin Harrison, President of the U.S. With a Concise Biographical Sketch of Hon. Whitelaw Reid, Ex-Minister to France [by Murat Halstad] (Philadelphia: Edgewood Publishing Co., 1892.)
- Lew Wallace: An Autobiography (New York: Harper and Brothers, 1906.) Two volumes.

== Dates of rank ==
- 2nd Lieutenant, 1st Indiana Infantry - June 18, 1846
- Mustered out of service - June 14, 1847
- Colonel, 11th Indiana Infantry - April 25, 1861
- Mustered out of service - August 4, 1861
- Colonel, 11th Indiana Infantry - August 31, 1861
- Brigadier General, Volunteers - September 3, 1861
- Major General, Volunteers - March 21, 1862
- Resigned - November 30, 1865

== See also ==
- Bibliography of the American Civil War
- Bibliography of Ulysses S. Grant
- List of American Civil War battles
- List of American Civil War generals (Union)

== Bibliography ==
- Boomhower, Ray E. (2005). The Sword and the Pen. Indianapolis: Indiana Historical Society Press. ISBN 0-87195-185-1.
- Eicher, John H. & Eicher, David J. (2001). Civil War High Commands. Stanford University Press. ISBN 0-8047-3641-3.
- Ferraro, William M. (June 2008). "A Struggle for Respect: Lew Wallace's Relationships with Ulysses S. Grant and William Tecumseh Sherman After Shiloh". Indiana Magazine of History. 104 (2). Bloomington, Indiana: Indiana University: 125–152.
- Forbes, John D. (December 1948). "Lew Wallace, Romantic". Indiana Magazine of History. 44 (4). Bloomington: Indiana University: 385–392.
- Grant, Ulysses S. (1993) [1885–1886]. Personal Memoirs of U.S. Grant. Vol. I & II. New York: Charles L. Webster and Co. ISBN 0-914427-67-9.
- Gronert, Theodore G. (1958). Sugar Creek Saga: A History and Development of Montgomery County. Wabash College.
- Gugin, Linda C.; James E. St. Clair (2006). The Governors of Indiana. Indianapolis: Indiana Historical Society Press. ISBN 0-87195-196-7.
- Groom, Winston (2012). Shiloh 1862. National Geographic Books. ISBN 978-1-4262-0879-9.
- Hanson, Victor Davis (2003). Ripples of Battle: How Wars of the Past Still Determine How We Fight, How We Live, and How We Think. Doubleday. ISBN 0-385-50400-4.
- Kennedy, Frances H., ed. (1998). The Civil War Battlefield Guide (2nd ed.). Houghton Mifflin. ISBN 0-395-74012-6.
- Lifson, Amy (2009). "Ben-Hur". Humanities. 30 (6). Washington, D.C.: National Endowment for the Humanities. Archived from the original on October 15, 2015.
- McKee, Irving (September 1941). "The Early Life of Lew Wallace". Indiana Magazine of History. 37 (3). Bloomington: Indiana University: 205–216.
- Morrow, Barbara Olenyik (1994). From Ben-Hur to Sister Carrie: Remembering the Lives and Works of Five Indiana Authors. Indianapolis: Guild Press of Indiana. ISBN 978-1878208606.
- Morsberger, Robert Eustis; Morsberger, Katharine M. (1980). Lew Wallace: Militant Romantic. New York: McGraw-Hill. ISBN 0-07-043305-4.
- Russo, Dorothy Ritter; Thelma Lois Sullivan (1952). Bibliographical Studies of Seven Authors of Crawfordsville, Indiana.
- Richardson, Albert Deane; Fletcher, R. H. (1885). A Personal History of Ulysses S. Grant. American Publishing Company.
- Smith, Jean Edward (2001). Grant. New York: Simon & Schuster. ISBN 0-684-84927-5.
- Smith, Timothy B. (2014). Shiloh: Conquer or Perish. Lawrence: University Press of Kansas. ISBN 978-0-7006-2347-1.
- Stephens, Gail (2010). The Shadow of Shiloh: Major General Lew Wallace in the Civil War. Indianapolis: Indiana Historical Society Press. ISBN 978-0-87195-287-5.
- Utley, Robert (1989). Billy the Kid: A Short and Violent Life. Lincoln: University of Nebraska Press. ISBN 978-0-80324-553-2.
- Wallace, Lew (1998). Ben-Hur. Oxford World's Classics.
- Warner, Ezra J. (1992) [1964]. Generals in Blue: Lives of the Union Commanders. Baton Rouge: Louisiana State University Press. ISBN 978-0-8071-0822-2.
- Welsh, Jack D. (1996). Medical Histories of Union Generals. Kent, OH: The Kent State University Press. ISBN 0-87338-552-7.
- Woodworth, Steven E., ed. (2001). Grant's Lieutenants: From Cairo to Vicksburg. University Press of Kansas. ISBN 0-7006-1127-4.

Military offices
Preceded by Henry H. Lockwood	Commander of the VIII Corps (Union Army); March 22, 1864 – February 1, 1865	Succeeded by William W. Morris
Preceded by Henry H. Lockwood	Commander of the VIII Corps (Union Army); April 19, 1865 – August 1, 1865	Succeeded by None, end of war
Political offices
Preceded by Samuel Beach Axtell	Governor of New Mexico; 1878–1881	Succeeded by Lionel Allen Sheldon
