= Susan Wallace =

American author and poet (1830–1907)

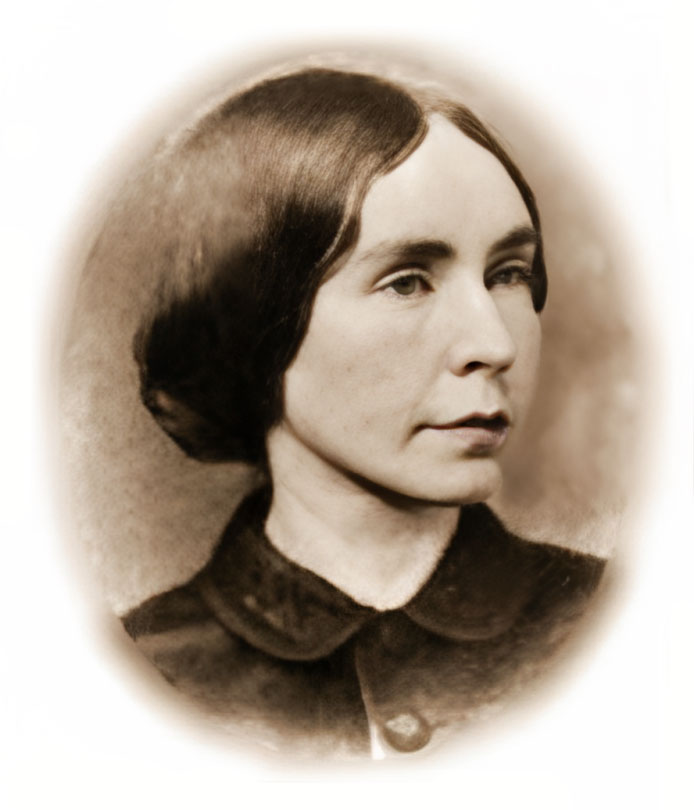
- c. 1860
- Born: Susan Arnold Elston; December 25, 1830; Crawfordsville, Indiana
- Died: October 1, 1907 (aged 76); Crawfordsville, Indiana
- Resting place: Oak Hill Cemetery, Crawfordsville, Indiana
- Occupations: Writer, editor
- Spouse(s): Lew Wallace (1852–1905; his death)
- Children: Henry Lane Wallace
- Writing career
- Period: 1858–1906
- Notable work: "The Patter of Little Feet"

Susan Arnold Elston Wallace (December 25, 1830 – October 1, 1907) was an American author and poet from Crawfordsville, Indiana. In addition to writing travel articles for several American magazines and newspapers, Wallace published six books, five of which contain collected essays from her travels in the New Mexico Territory, Europe, and the Middle East in the 1880s: The Land of the Pueblos (1888), The Storied Sea (1883), The Repose in Egypt: A Medley (1888), Along the Bosphorus, and Other Sketches (1898), and The City of the King: What the Child Jesus Saw and Heard (1903). She was also the wife of Lew Wallace, a lawyer, American Civil War general, politician, author and diplomat. Susan completed the manuscript of Lew Wallace's two-volume autobiography following his death in 1905, with the assistance of Mary Hannah Krout, another Crawfordsville author. Wallace died in Crawfordsville in 1907.

== Early life and education ==
Susan Arnold Elston was born on December 25, 1830, in Crawfordsville, Indiana. She was the third daughter, the fourth of nine children, born to wealthy and influential parents, Isaac Compton Elston, a Crawfordsville dry goods merchant, and Maria Eveline (Akin) Elston, whose family were Quakers from upstate New York. Susan was educated at home in Crawfordsville and at Dr. Gibbons' Friends' Boarding School in Poughkeepsie, New York. While at boarding school, she studied literature, geometry, and writing, but preferred music, especially playing guitar and piano.

== Marriage and family ==
Susan married Lew Wallace on May 6, 1852. The couple first met in 1848 at the home of Joanna and Henry S. Lane in Crawfordsville. Joanna was Susan's older sister; Lane was Wallace's former military commander during the Mexican War and became one of his closest associates. At the time of their courtship, Wallace was a prosecuting attorney in Covington, Indiana. His earlier reputation for getting into trouble caused Susan's father to disapprove of him initially, but the courtship continued. Susan accepted Wallace's marriage proposal in 1849. Three years after their first meeting, the couple were married at the Elston family home in Crawfordsville. Late in life she still described him as "my first, last, and only love."

The Wallaces established their first home at Covington, where Lew continued to practice law, but moved to Crawfordsville in 1853, to be closer to her family. The couple had one son, Henry Lane Wallace, born on February 17, 1853, in Covington. He was named for their brother-in-law, Henry Smith Lane.

Although Susan was a talented writer and musician, she preferred to remain largely in the shadows as her husband's companion and advisor. Lew became a major general during the American Civil War, who was later appointed governor to the New Mexico Territory and served as the U.S. Minister to the Ottoman Empire. He also went on to become one of the most celebrated American authors of the 19th century, following the publication of Ben-Hur: A Tale of the Christ (1880).

On occasion, Susan accompanied her husband to his various posts, but Crawfordsville remained their home. In February 1879, Susan joined Lew in Santa Fe, New Mexico, where he served as the territorial governor, but she disliked its dusty, dry climate, and returned to Indiana in October. In 1881 Susan accompanied her husband to his diplomatic post in Constantinople, Turkey, and traveled throughout Europe, Egypt, and the Holy Land during their years abroad. When Lew's diplomatic assignment ended in 1885, the Wallaces returned to Crawfordsville, where Susan was prominent in the town's literary community. She befriended other local writers, including Mary Hannah Krout and her sister, Caroline Virginia Krout, and continued to write.

== Career ==
Susan Wallace was a published author long before her husband was. "The Patter of Little Feet", one of her best known poems, first appeared in the Cincinnati Daily Gazette on April 17, 1858. Largely forgotten by modern readers, her works focused on home, friends, travel, and Christianity. She was also very interested in women's roles, especially after traveling with her husband to Turkey and the Middle East. Her travel writing is described as more reflective and poetic than a detailed travel guide. She offered romantic and sentimental narratives of her travels in addition to vivid descriptions, with touches of realism and humor.

Susan's writing first appeared in American magazines and newspapers, but collected essays later appeared in her books, which were published between 1883 and 1903, after she had reached the age of fifty. During her brief time in the New Mexico Territory in 1879, Susan described her experiences in a series of articles that she had previously sent to the Atlantic Monthly, the New York Independent, and the New York Tribune. A collection of these essays were later included in her book, The Land of the Pueblo (1888). Susan also wrote about her travels abroad for American magazines and syndicated newspapers. Collected essays were later published in four books: The Storied Sea (1883), A Repose in Egypt, A Medley (1888), Along the Bosphorus, and Other Sketches (1898), and The City of the King: What the Child Jesus Saw and Heard (1903). Ginèvra; or, The Old Oak Chest, A Christmas Story (1866), which is based on a Samuel Rogers poem, initially appeared in 1884 in the New York Independent.

In addition to her own writing, Susan was involved in her husband's literary career. Lew acknowledged Susan's role as his editor, reader, and critic, and attributed much of his success in writing to her literary criticism. Wallace was writing his memoirs when he died in 1905, and Susan completed his manuscript with assistance from Mary Hannah Krout, another Crawfordsville author. Using correspondence, speeches, notes, and other materials, they added another 204 pages to his two-volume work, An Autobiography (1906). In volume two, page 796, of the 1906 edition, Susan added: "And here the Autobiography ends. What follows must be a plain record of facts without attempt at polish or effect."

== Death and legacy ==
Susan Wallace died in Crawfordsville on October 1, 1907, at the age of seventy-six. She is buried beside her husband in Crawfordsville's Oak Hill Cemetery. A collection of her papers are preserved as part of the Wallace Collection at the Indiana Historical Society in Indianapolis.

== Selected works ==
- The Storied Sea (Boston: James R. Osgood and Company, 1883).
- Ginèvra; or, The Old Oak Chest, A Christmas Story (New York: Worthington, 1887) [illustrated by Lew Wallace].
- The Land of the Pueblos (New York: John B. Alden, 1888) [with illustrations by Lew Wallace].
- The Repose in Egypt: A Medley (New York: John B. Alden, 1888).
- Along the Bosphorus and Other Sketches (Chicago: Rand, McNally and Co., 1898).
- The City of the King: What the Child Jesus Saw and Heard (Indianapolis: Bobbs-Merrill, 1903).
