= Colburn, Indiana =

- Census-designated place
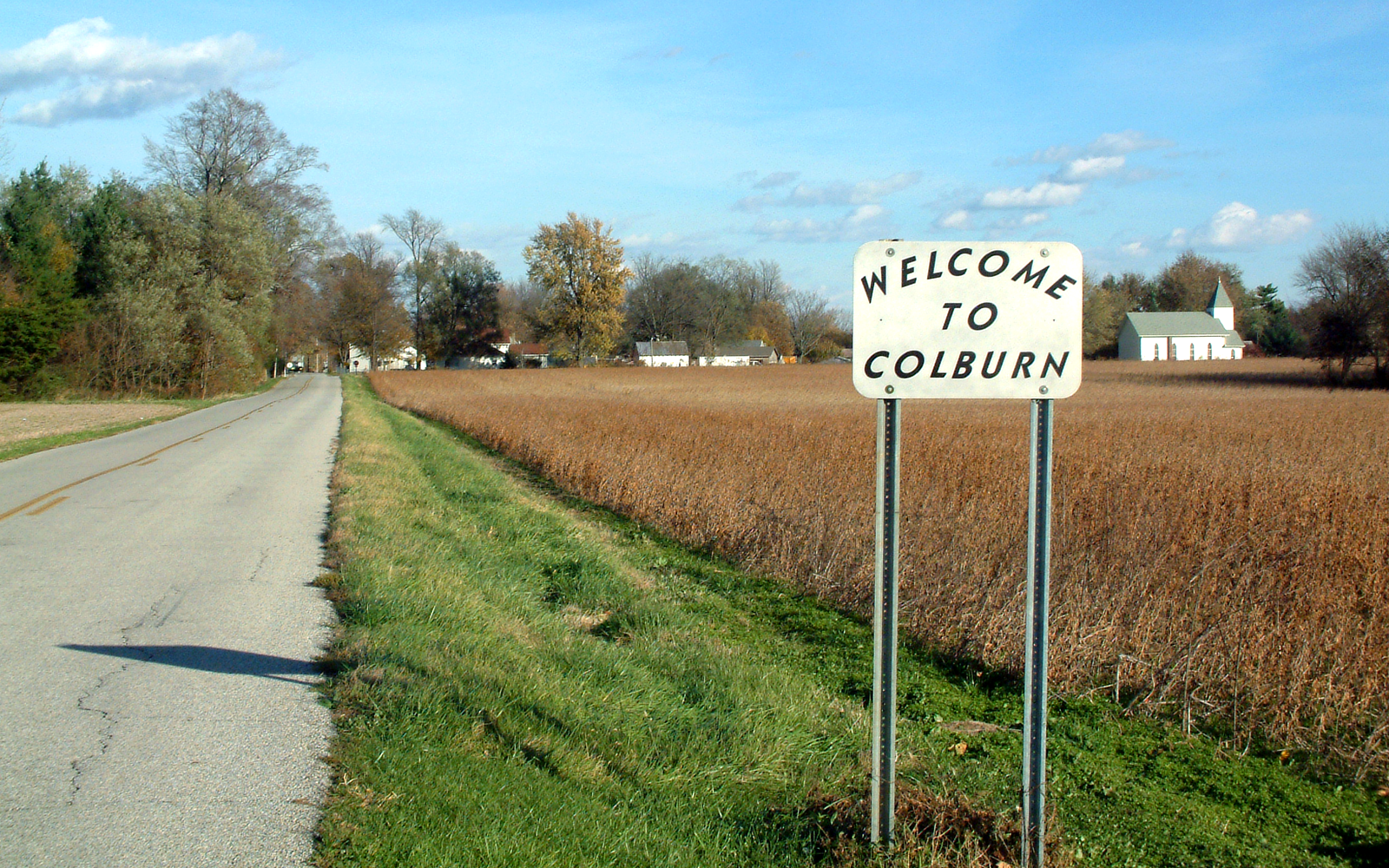
- Looking east toward Colburn along County Road 700 North. Welcome sign made by Bill Fitzmaurice, a resident of Colburn for 25 years.

- Location of Colburn in Tippecanoe County, Indiana.
- Coordinates: 40°31′08″N 86°42′44″W
- Country: United States
- State: Indiana
- County: Tippecanoe
- Township: Washington
- Founded: 1858
- Founder: Jacob H. Chapman

Area
  - Total: 0.10 sq mi (0.26 km^{2})
  - Land: 0.10 sq mi (0.26 km^{2})
  - Water: 0 sq mi (0.00 km^{2})
- Elevation: 663 ft (202 m)

Population (2020)
  - Total: 164
  - Density: 1,637.5/sq mi (632.23/km^{2})
- Time zone: UTC-5 (Eastern (EST))
  - Summer (DST): UTC-4 (EDT)
- Zip Code: 47905
- Area code: 765
- GNIS feature ID: 2583448

Colburn is a small unincorporated census-designated place in northeastern Washington Township, Tippecanoe County, in the U.S. state of Indiana. As of the 2020 census, Colburn had a population of 164.

It is part of the Lafayette, Indiana Metropolitan Statistical Area.

== History ==
Colburn was originally called Chapmanville.

A post office was established at Colburn in 1860, and remained in operation until it was discontinued in 1988.

There are two cemeteries in Colburn, the first is Zion Evangelical Lutheran Cemetery, located to the southwest of the town. It was first recorded as having burials as early as 1812. The second cemetery (Colburn E.U.B. cemetery) is technically a graveyard and is attached to the Colburn Bible Church (Formerly Evangelical United Brethren). It was first recorded as having burials in 1842.

== Geography ==
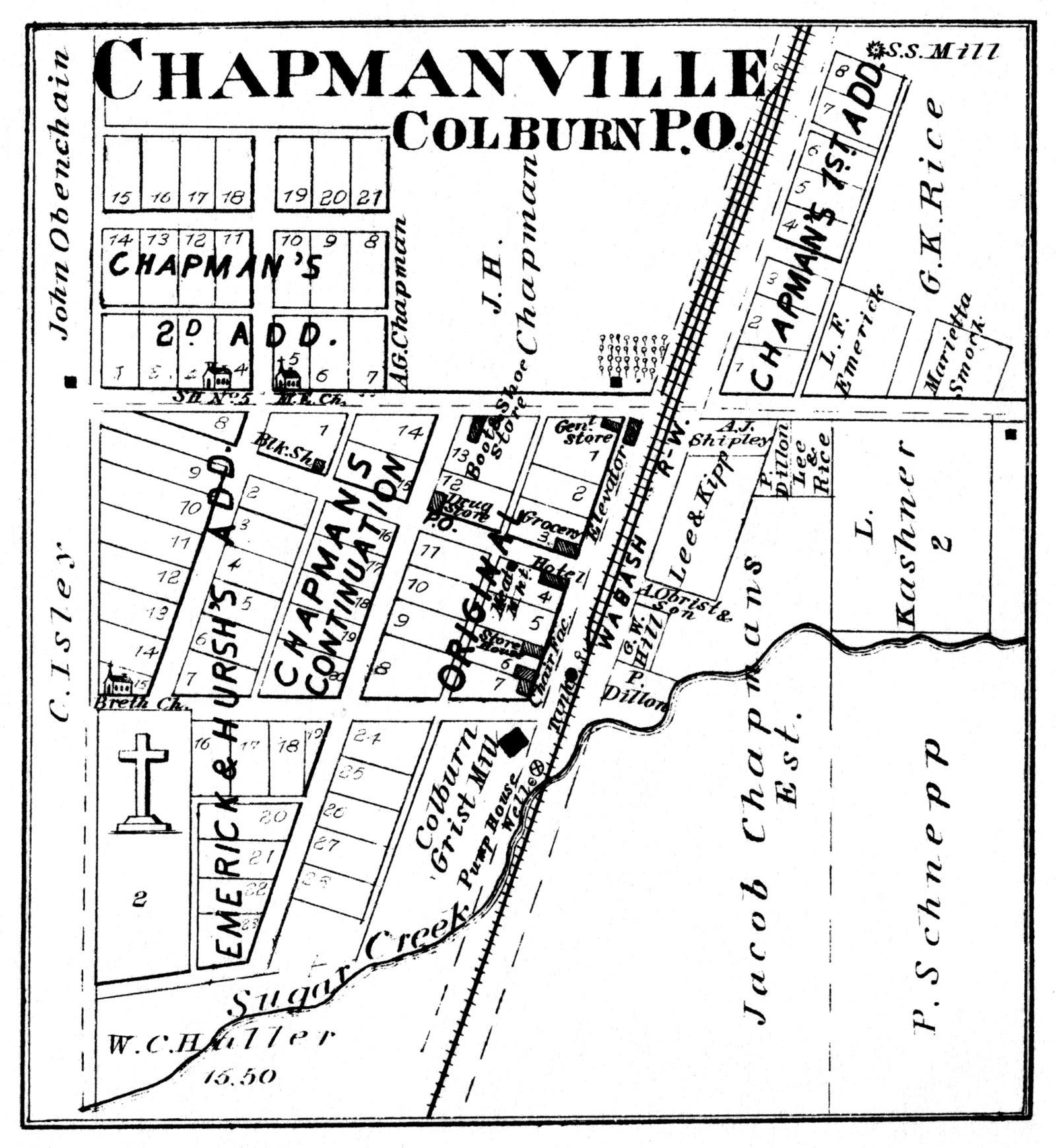
Colburn in 1878.

Colburn is located in Washington Township. Nearby communities include Lafayette (12 miles southwest), Delphi (6 miles north), Buck Creek (4 miles south) and Americus (3.5 miles west).

== Demographics ==
Historical population
Census	Pop.	Note	%±
2020	164		—
U.S. Decennial Census

== Education ==
It is in the Tippecanoe School Corporation. Residents are zoned to Hershey Elementary School, East Tipp Middle School, and William Henry Harrison High School.
