= Delp =

Delp may refer to:

== People ==
- Delp (surname)
- Wilhelm Delp Styer (1893–1975), United States Army lieutenant general during World War II

== Other uses ==
- Delp, Indiana, an unincorporated community
- 8282 Delp, a minor planet in the asteroid belt
- Domestic Efficient Lighting Programme (DELP), a Government Scheme in India
