= Wea Township, Tippecanoe County, Indiana =

Wea Township
- Township
- Location in Tippecanoe County
- Coordinates: 40°20′34″N 86°52′02″W
- Country: United States
- State: Indiana
- County: Tippecanoe

Government
  - Type: Indiana township

Area
  - Total: 36.06 sq mi (93.4 km^{2})
  - Land: 36.04 sq mi (93.3 km^{2})
  - Water: 0.02 sq mi (0.052 km^{2}) 0.06%
- Elevation: 633 ft (193 m)

Population (2020)
  - Total: 34,098
  - Density: 878.5/sq mi (339.2/km^{2})
- Time zone: UTC-5 (Eastern (EST))
  - Summer (DST): UTC-4 (EDT)
- ZIP codes: 47905, 47909
- Area code: 765
- GNIS feature ID: 454043

Wea Township is one of thirteen townships in Tippecanoe County, Indiana, United States. As of the 2010 census, its population was 31,660 and it contained 13,022 housing units.

== Geography ==
According to the 2010 census, the township has a total area of 36.06 square miles (93.4 km^{2}), of which 36.04 square miles (93.3 km^{2}) (or 99.94%) is land and 0.02 square miles (0.052 km^{2}) (or 0.06%) is water.

=== Cities, towns, villages ===
- Lafayette (south quarter)

=== Unincorporated communities ===
- South Raub at 40.3014256°N 86.9133411°W

(This list is based on USGS data and may include former settlements.)

=== Adjacent townships ===
- Fairfield Township (north)
- Perry Township (northeast)
- Sheffield Township (east)
- Lauramie Township (southeast)
- Randolph Township (southwest)
- Union Township (west)

=== Cemeteries ===
The township contains these cemeteries: Conarroe, Fink, Kenny, Meadow View, O'Neall, Provault, Shoemaker, Sickler, Spring Grove and Wildcat.

=== Major highways ===
- US Route 52
- US Route 231
- Indiana State Road 25

== Government and infrastructure ==
Wea Township Fire Department provides firefighting services.

== School districts ==
School districts covering sections of the township include:

- Lafayette School Corporation
- Tippecanoe School Corporation

Portions in the Tippecanoe district are zoned to McCutcheon High School. People in the Lafayette school district section are zoned to Jefferson High School, the district's sole comprehensive high school.

== Political districts ==
- Indiana's 4th congressional district
- State House District 26
- State House District 27
- State House District 41
- State Senate District 22
