= 2016 United States presidential election in Indiana =

- November 8, 2016
- Turnout: 57.9%

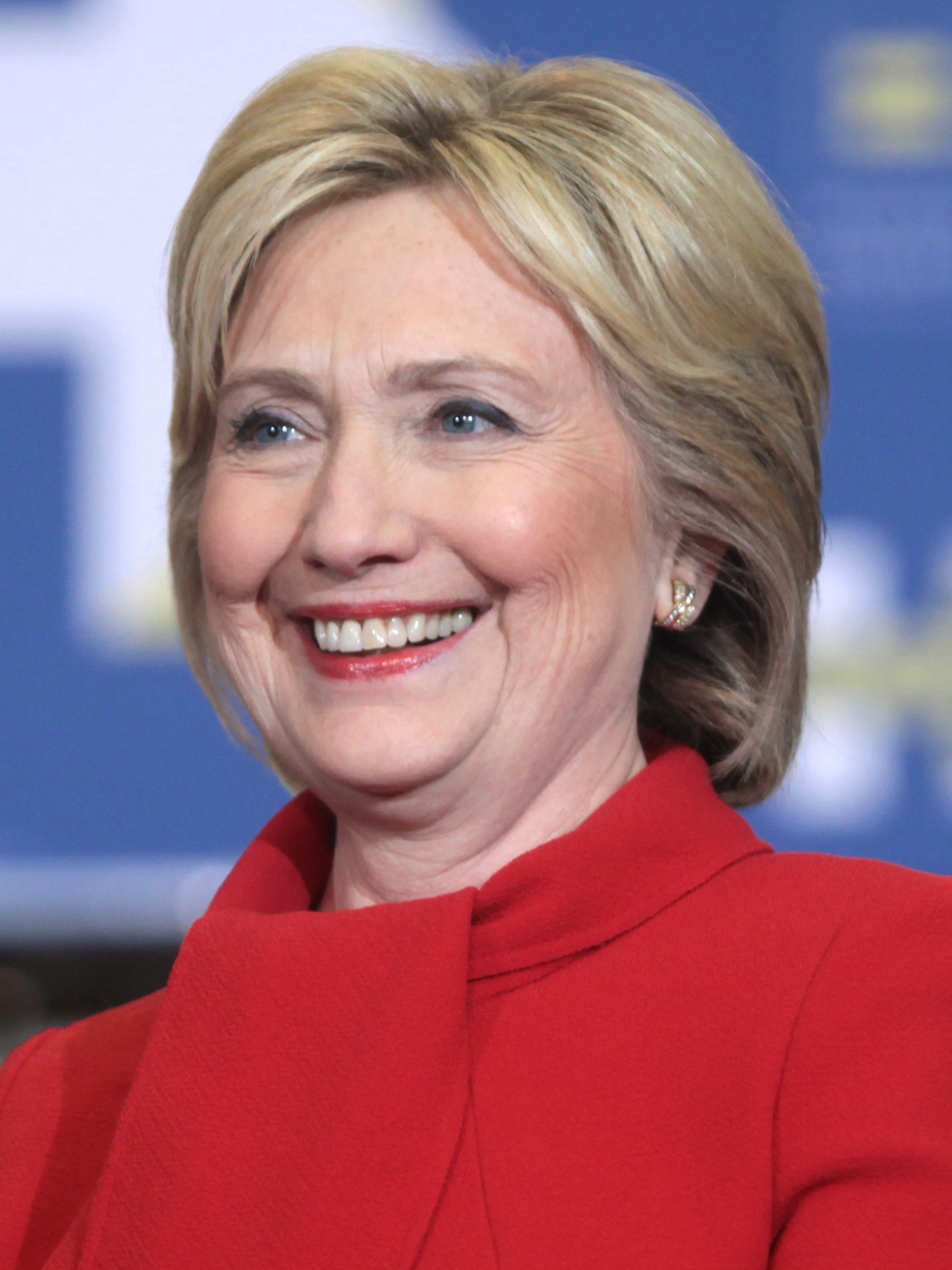
Nominee	Donald Trump	Hillary Clinton
Party	Republican	Democratic
Home state	New York	New York
Running mate	Mike Pence	Tim Kaine
Electoral vote	11	0
Popular vote	1,557,286	1,033,126
Percentage	56.94%	37.77%

Trump
40–50%
50–60%
60–70%
70–80%
80–90%
90–100%
Clinton
40–50%
50–60%
60–70%
70–80%
80–90%
90–100%
Tie/No Data
President before election
Barack Obama
Democratic
Elected President
Donald Trump
Republican

Treemap of the popular vote by county.

A presidential election was held in Indiana on Tuesday, November 8, 2016, as part of the 2016 United States presidential election in which all 50 states plus the District of Columbia participated. Indiana voters chose electors to represent them in the Electoral College via a popular vote, pitting the Republican Party's nominee, businessman Donald Trump, and running mate Indiana Governor Mike Pence against Democratic Party nominee, former Secretary of State Hillary Clinton, and her running mate Virginia Senator Tim Kaine. Indiana has 11 electoral votes in the Electoral College.

Trump won the state with 56.94% of the vote, while Clinton received 37.77%. Indiana is the home state of Pence, which was believed to have provided assistance to the Trump campaign in what already would have been a Republican-leaning state.

== Primary elections ==
=== Democratic primary ===
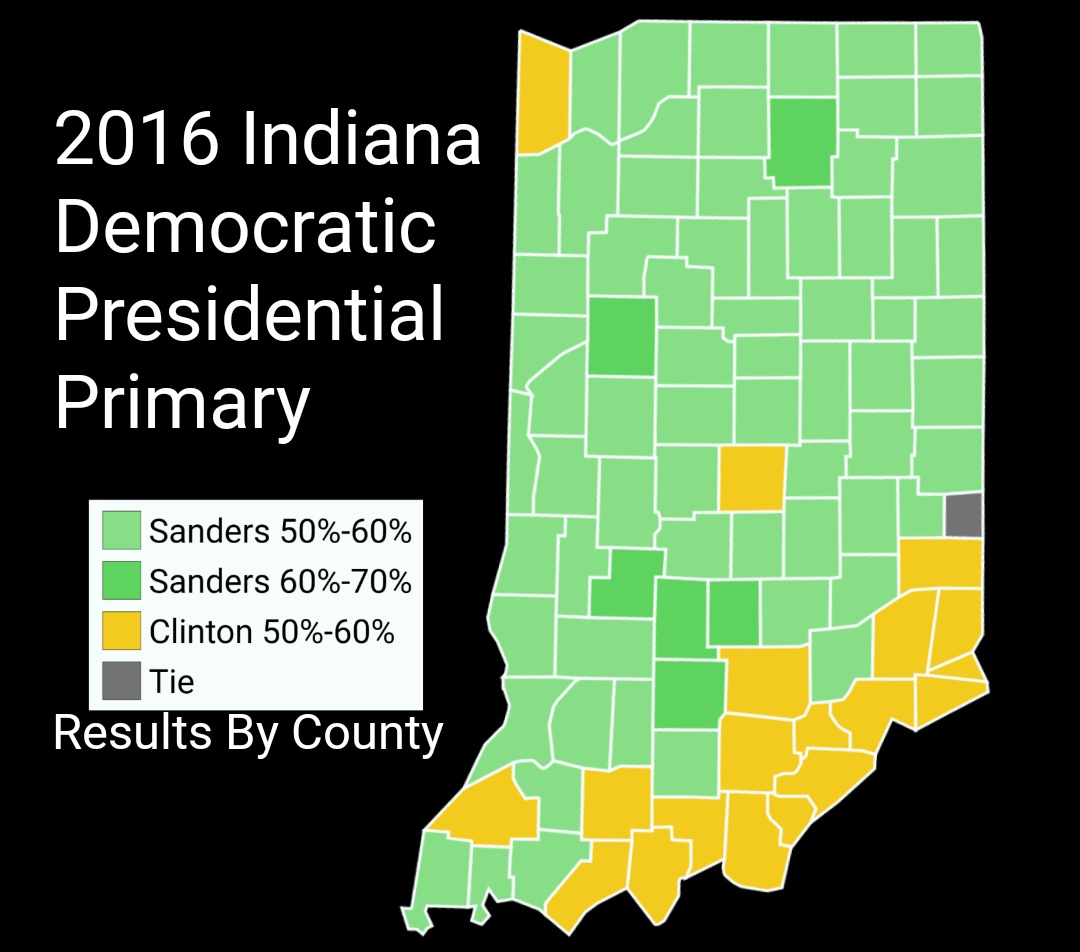
County results of the 2016 Indiana Democratic presidential primary. Bernie Sanders Hillary Clinton

Two candidates appeared on the Democratic presidential primary ballot:

- Hillary Clinton
- Bernie Sanders

Indiana Democratic primary, May 3, 2016
Candidate	Popular vote		Estimated delegates		
Candidate	Count	Percentage	Pledged	Unpledged	Total
Bernie Sanders	335,074	52.46%	44	0	44
Hillary Clinton	303,705	47.54%	39	7	46
Uncommitted	—N/a		0	2	2
Total	638,779	100%	83	9	92

=== Republican primary ===
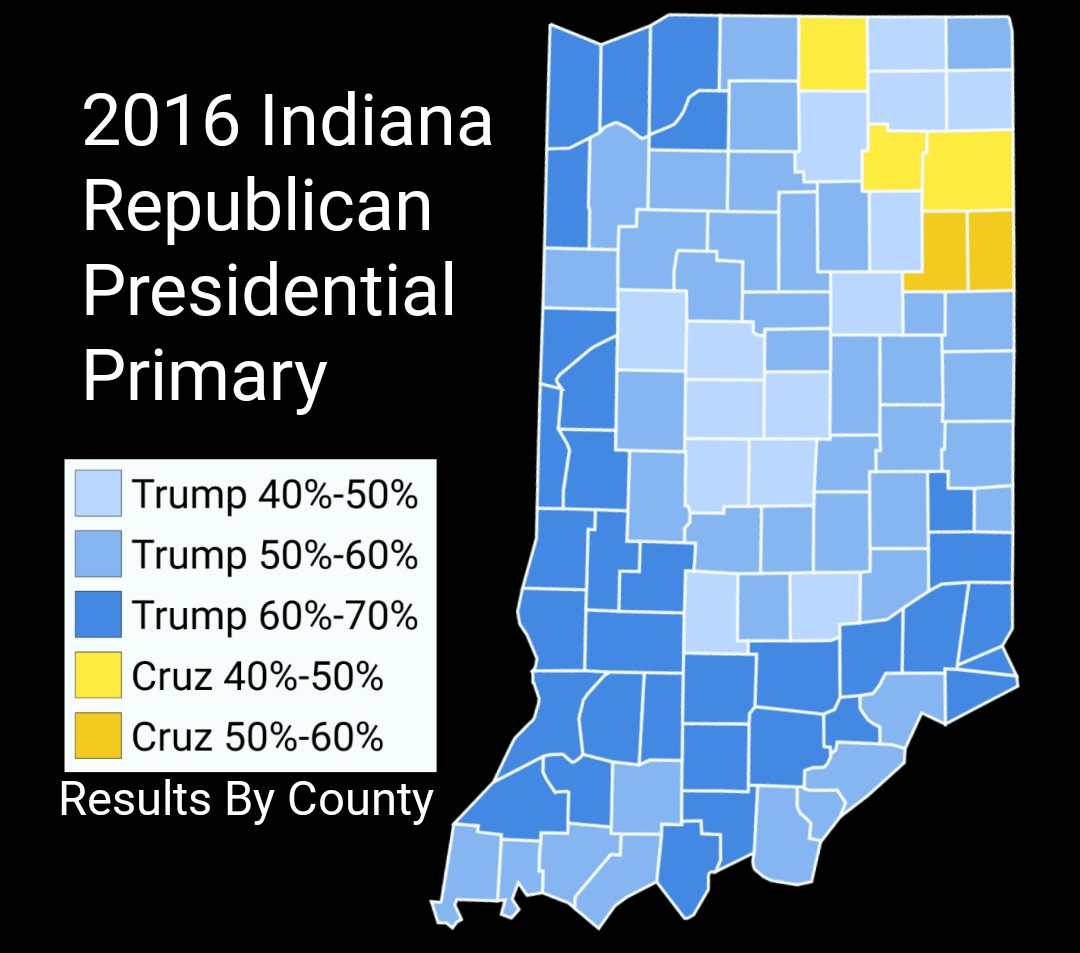
Donald Trump Ted Cruz

Twelve candidates appeared on the Republican presidential primary ballot:

- Jeb Bush (withdrawn)
- Ben Carson (withdrawn)
- Chris Christie (withdrawn)
- Ted Cruz (campaign suspended after loss in Indiana GOP Primary, a 'winner-take-all' primary)
- Carly Fiorina (withdrawn)
- Jim Gilmore (withdrawn)
- Mike Huckabee (withdrawn)
- John Kasich
- Rand Paul (withdrawn)
- Marco Rubio (withdrawn)
- Rick Santorum (withdrawn)
- Donald Trump

Indiana Republican primary, May 3, 2016
Candidate	Votes	Percentage	Actual delegate count		
Candidate	Votes	Percentage	Bound	Unbound	Total
Donald Trump	591,514	53.26%	57	0	57
Ted Cruz	406,783	36.63%	0	0	0
John Kasich	84,111	7.57%	0	0	0
Ben Carson (withdrawn)	8,914	0.80%	0	0	0
Jeb Bush (withdrawn)	6,508	0.59%	0	0	0
Marco Rubio (withdrawn)	5,175	0.47%	0	0	0
Rand Paul (withdrawn)	4,306	0.39%	0	0	0
Chris Christie (withdrawn)	1,738	0.16%	0	0	0
Carly Fiorina (withdrawn)	1,494	0.13%	0	0	0
Unprojected delegates:			0	0	0
Total:	1,110,543	100.00%	57	0	57
Source: The Green Papers

== General election ==
=== Polling ===
Donald Trump won every pre-election poll conducted by at least 5 points, and often by double digits. The average of the last 3 polls showed Trump ahead of Hillary Clinton 49% to 38%. Donald Trump had won almost all the undecided vote, as shown by the results where he won 56% to 37%.

=== Predictions ===
Source	Ranking	As of
CNN	Safe R	November 4, 2016
Cook Political Report	Likely R	November 7, 2016
Electoral-vote.com	Safe R	November 7, 2016
NBC	Lean R	November 7, 2016
RealClearPolitics	Likely R	November 7, 2016
Rothenberg Political Report	Lean R	November 7, 2016
Sabato's Crystal Ball	Safe R	November 7, 2016

=== Results ===
2016 United States presidential election in Indiana
Party	Candidate	Votes	%	±%
Republican	Donald Trump Mike Pence	1,557,286	56.94%	+2.81%
Democratic	Hillary Clinton Tim Kaine	1,033,126	37.77%	−6.16%
Libertarian	Gary Johnson Bill Weld	133,993	4.90%	+2.99%
Green	Jill Stein (write-in) Ajamu Baraka	7,841	0.29%	+0.27%
Constitution	Darrell Castle (write-in) Scott Bradley	1,937	0.07%	+0.06%
Write-in		775	0.03%	+0.03%
Total votes		2,734,958	100.00%	

==== By congressional district ====
Trump won seven of nine congressional districts.

District	Trump	Clinton	Representative
1st	41%	53%	Pete Visclosky
2nd	58%	35%	Jackie Walorski
3rd	64%	30%	Marlin Stutzman
4th	63%	30%	Todd Rokita
5th	52%	41%	Susan Brooks
6th	67%	27%	Luke Messer
7th	36%	58%	André Carson
8th	64%	31%	Larry Bucshon
9th	60%	34%	Todd Young

==== By county ====
County	Donald Trump Republican		Hillary Clinton Democratic		Various candidates Other parties		Margin		Total
County	#	%	#	%	#	%	#	%	Total
Adams	9,648	73.12%	2,805	21.26%	741	5.62%	6,843	51.86%	13,194
Allen	83,930	56.47%	55,382	37.26%	9,320	6.27%	28,548	19.21%	148,632
Bartholomew	20,640	63.09%	9,841	30.08%	2,236	6.83%	10,799	33.01%	32,717
Benton	2,579	69.93%	860	23.32%	249	6.75%	1,719	46.61%	3,688
Blackford	3,350	68.63%	1,243	25.47%	288	5.90%	2,107	43.16%	4,881
Boone	19,654	60.41%	10,181	31.29%	2,702	8.30%	9,473	29.12%	32,537
Brown	5,016	62.69%	2,518	31.47%	467	5.84%	2,498	31.22%	8,001
Carroll	6,273	72.10%	1,892	21.74%	536	6.16%	4,381	50.36%	8,701
Cass	9,701	68.27%	3,759	26.46%	749	5.27%	5,942	41.81%	14,209
Clark	30,035	57.99%	18,808	36.32%	2,946	5.69%	11,227	21.67%	51,789
Clay	8,531	75.26%	2,306	20.34%	498	4.40%	6,225	54.92%	11,335
Clinton	8,531	71.15%	2,819	23.51%	641	5.34%	5,712	47.64%	11,991
Crawford	3,015	64.95%	1,323	28.50%	304	6.55%	1,692	36.45%	4,642
Daviess	8,545	78.98%	1,800	16.64%	474	4.38%	6,745	62.34%	10,819
Dearborn	18,113	75.06%	4,883	20.24%	1,135	4.70%	13,230	54.82%	24,131
Decatur	8,490	75.95%	2,121	18.97%	567	5.08%	6,369	56.98%	11,178
DeKalb	12,054	70.92%	3,942	23.19%	1,000	5.89%	8,112	47.73%	16,996
Delaware	24,263	53.31%	18,153	39.89%	3,093	6.80%	6,110	13.42%	45,509
Dubois	13,365	66.51%	5,389	26.82%	1,341	6.67%	7,976	39.69%	20,095
Elkhart	41,867	63.21%	20,740	31.31%	3,632	5.48%	21,127	31.90%	66,239
Fayette	6,839	71.25%	2,252	23.46%	507	5.29%	4,587	47.79%	9,598
Floyd	21,432	56.64%	13,945	36.85%	2,465	6.51%	7,487	19.79%	37,842
Fountain	5,662	75.15%	1,476	19.59%	396	5.26%	4,186	55.56%	7,534
Franklin	8,669	78.12%	1,969	17.74%	459	4.14%	6,700	60.38%	11,097
Fulton	6,010	71.23%	1,960	23.23%	467	5.54%	4,050	48.00%	8,437
Gibson	11,081	71.56%	3,721	24.03%	682	4.41%	7,360	47.53%	15,484
Grant	17,008	66.51%	7,010	27.41%	1,554	6.08%	9,998	39.10%	25,572
Greene	10,277	74.14%	2,929	21.13%	655	4.73%	7,348	53.01%	13,861
Hamilton	87,404	56.04%	57,263	36.72%	11,299	7.24%	30,141	19.32%	155,966
Hancock	25,074	68.76%	8,904	24.42%	2,490	6.82%	16,170	44.34%	36,468
Harrison	12,943	69.74%	4,783	25.77%	832	4.49%	8,160	43.97%	18,558
Hendricks	48,337	63.45%	22,600	29.67%	5,247	6.88%	25,737	33.78%	76,184
Henry	13,895	68.48%	5,124	25.25%	1,271	6.27%	8,771	43.23%	20,290
Howard	23,675	63.40%	11,215	30.03%	2,452	6.57%	12,460	33.37%	37,342
Huntington	11,649	71.99%	3,506	21.67%	1,026	6.34%	8,143	50.32%	16,181
Jackson	12,859	72.79%	3,843	21.75%	965	5.46%	9,016	51.04%	17,667
Jasper	9,382	69.61%	3,329	24.70%	767	5.69%	6,053	44.91%	13,478
Jay	5,697	71.02%	1,889	23.55%	436	5.43%	3,808	47.47%	8,022
Jefferson	8,546	62.59%	4,326	31.69%	781	5.72%	4,220	30.90%	13,653
Jennings	8,224	73.23%	2,364	21.05%	643	5.72%	5,860	52.18%	11,231
Johnson	45,456	67.70%	17,318	25.79%	4,373	6.51%	28,138	41.91%	67,147
Knox	11,077	71.00%	3,772	24.18%	753	4.82%	7,305	46.82%	15,602
Kosciusko	23,935	73.78%	6,313	19.46%	2,193	6.76%	17,622	54.32%	32,441
LaGrange	7,025	72.68%	2,080	21.52%	561	5.80%	4,945	51.16%	9,666
Lake	75,625	37.29%	116,935	57.66%	10,243	5.05%	-41,310	-20.37%	202,803
LaPorte	22,687	49.74%	19,798	43.41%	3,124	6.85%	2,889	6.33%	45,609
Lawrence	14,035	72.95%	4,210	21.88%	993	5.17%	9,825	51.07%	19,238
Madison	32,376	59.54%	18,595	34.20%	3,407	6.26%	13,781	25.34%	54,378
Marion	130,360	35.53%	212,899	58.03%	23,620	6.44%	-82,539	-22.50%	366,879
Marshall	12,288	67.36%	4,798	26.30%	1,155	6.34%	7,490	41.06%	18,241
Martin	3,697	76.29%	881	18.18%	268	5.53%	2,816	58.11%	4,846
Miami	9,975	73.34%	2,766	20.34%	860	6.32%	7,209	53.00%	13,601
Monroe	20,592	35.23%	34,216	58.53%	3,646	6.24%	-13,624	-23.30%	58,454
Montgomery	11,059	72.41%	3,362	22.01%	851	5.58%	7,697	50.40%	15,272
Morgan	23,674	75.28%	6,040	19.21%	1,732	5.51%	17,634	56.07%	31,446
Newton	4,077	69.57%	1,404	23.96%	379	6.47%	2,673	45.61%	5,860
Noble	12,198	71.32%	3,904	22.83%	1,002	5.85%	8,294	48.49%	17,104
Ohio	2,118	72.51%	686	23.49%	117	4.00%	1,432	49.02%	2,921
Orange	5,803	70.10%	2,048	24.74%	427	5.16%	3,755	45.36%	8,278
Owen	6,153	71.41%	1,946	22.59%	517	6.00%	4,207	48.82%	8,616
Parke	4,863	73.28%	1,441	21.71%	332	5.01%	3,422	51.57%	6,636
Perry	4,556	56.30%	3,062	37.84%	474	5.86%	1,494	18.46%	8,092
Pike	4,398	73.58%	1,297	21.70%	282	4.72%	3,101	51.88%	5,977
Porter	38,832	49.62%	33,676	43.03%	5,758	7.35%	5,156	6.59%	78,266
Posey	8,404	66.74%	3,521	27.96%	667	5.30%	4,883	38.78%	12,592
Pulaski	3,854	70.60%	1,327	24.31%	278	5.09%	2,527	46.29%	5,459
Putnam	10,637	71.78%	3,356	22.65%	825	5.57%	7,281	49.13%	14,818
Randolph	7,517	71.43%	2,446	23.24%	560	5.33%	5,071	48.19%	10,523
Ripley	9,806	75.81%	2,471	19.10%	658	5.09%	7,335	56.71%	12,935
Rush	5,292	72.83%	1,525	20.99%	449	6.18%	3,767	51.84%	7,266
Scott	6,074	66.40%	2,642	28.88%	431	4.72%	3,432	37.52%	9,147
Shelby	12,718	70.34%	4,247	23.49%	1,115	6.17%	8,471	46.85%	18,080
Spencer	6,572	65.41%	2,861	28.47%	615	6.12%	3,711	36.94%	10,048
St. Joseph	52,021	46.51%	52,252	46.72%	7,569	6.77%	-231	-0.21%	111,842
Starke	6,367	68.34%	2,489	26.72%	460	4.94%	3,878	41.62%	9,316
Steuben	10,133	68.87%	3,744	25.45%	837	5.68%	6,389	43.42%	14,714
Sullivan	6,138	71.26%	2,113	24.53%	362	4.21%	4,025	46.73%	8,613
Switzerland	2,558	68.97%	930	25.07%	221	5.96%	1,628	43.90%	3,709
Tippecanoe	30,768	48.57%	27,282	43.07%	5,292	8.36%	3,486	5.50%	63,342
Tipton	5,589	74.42%	1,587	21.13%	334	4.45%	4,002	53.29%	7,510
Union	2,445	73.76%	715	21.57%	155	4.67%	1,730	52.19%	3,315
Vanderburgh	40,496	55.19%	28,530	38.88%	4,349	5.93%	11,966	16.31%	73,375
Vermillion	4,513	64.72%	2,081	29.84%	379	5.44%	2,432	34.88%	6,973
Vigo	21,937	54.67%	15,931	39.70%	2,259	5.63%	6,006	14.97%	40,127
Wabash	9,821	72.47%	3,018	22.27%	713	5.26%	6,803	50.20%	13,552
Warren	2,898	73.31%	839	21.22%	216	5.47%	2,059	52.09%	3,953
Warrick	19,113	63.84%	9,086	30.35%	1,741	5.81%	10,027	33.49%	29,940
Washington	8,209	72.12%	2,636	23.16%	537	4.72%	5,573	48.96%	11,382
Wayne	16,028	62.66%	8,322	32.53%	1,229	4.81%	7,706	30.13%	25,579
Wells	10,005	75.30%	2,586	19.46%	696	5.24%	7,419	55.84%	13,287
White	6,893	68.27%	2,590	25.65%	614	6.08%	4,303	42.62%	10,097
Whitley	11,358	72.07%	3,379	21.44%	1,022	6.49%	7,979	50.63%	15,759
Totals	1,557,286	56.42%	1,033,126	37.43%	169,963	6.15%	524,160	18.99%	2,760,375

Counties that flipped from Democratic to Republican

- Delaware (largest city: Muncie)
- LaPorte (largest city: Michigan City)
- Perry (largest city: Tell City)
- Porter (largest city: Portage)
- Vigo (largest city: Terre Haute)

== Analysis ==
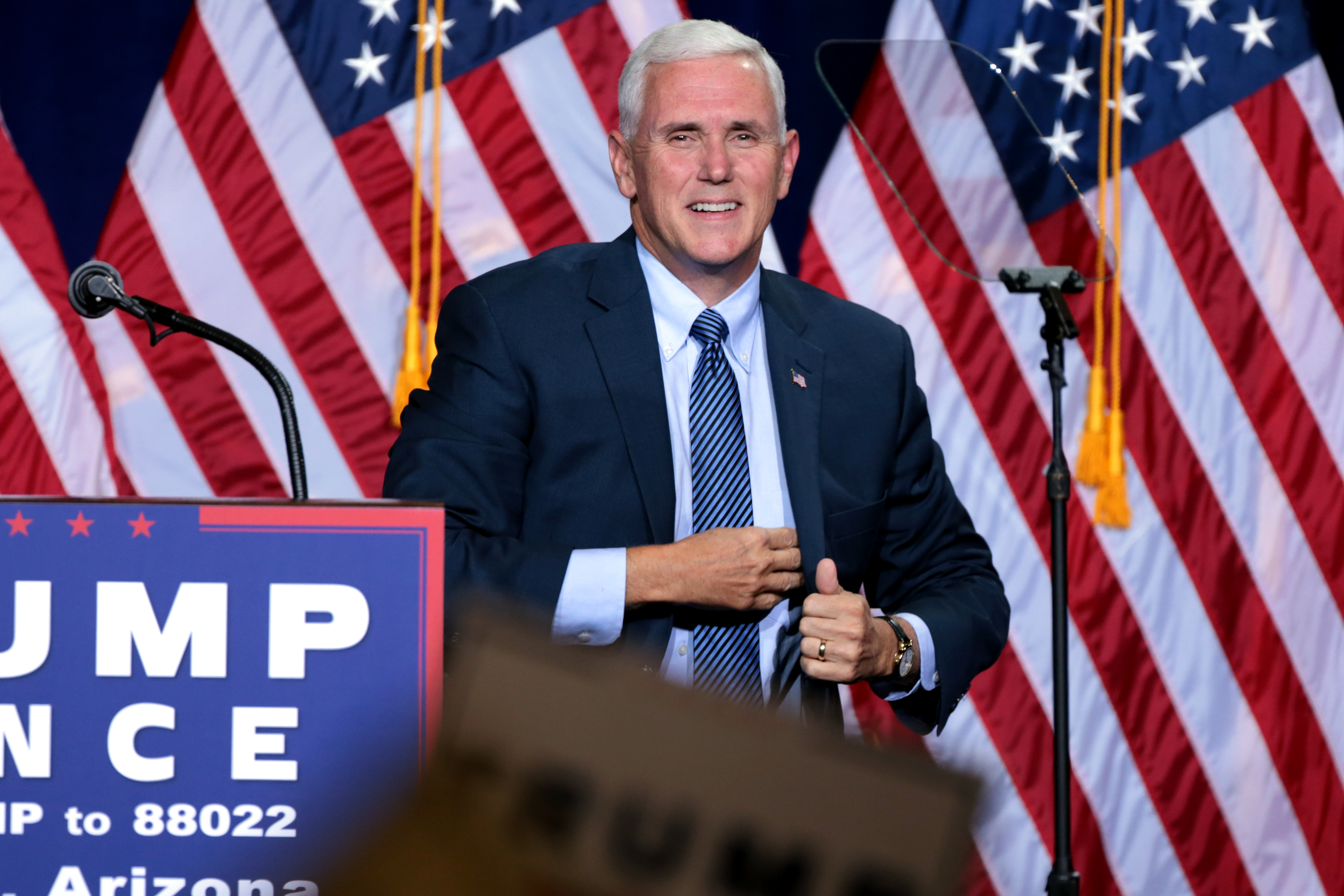
Indiana Governor Mike Pence ran as Donald Trump's running-mate

Of the 2,760,375 votes cast, Donald Trump won 1,557,286 votes, Hillary Clinton won 1,033,126 votes and Gary Johnson won 133,993 votes. Indiana has historically been the most conservative state in the Rust Belt. It went Democratic for Barack Obama in 2008—the first time it had done so since 1964, and only the fourth time since 1912. However, it has shifted back to being solidly Republican. Republican nominee Donald Trump carried the state by 19 points over Democrat Hillary Clinton, thus gaining all of Indiana's 11 electoral votes.

Donald Trump's victory in Indiana can be attributed to several factors. For one, Donald Trump had selected Indiana governor Mike Pence as his running mate, effectively eliminating any chance that Clinton could repeat Obama's surprise upset win in the state over John McCain eight years prior. Also, the state skews whiter and more Evangelical Protestant than the rest of the Midwest and the Rust Belt overall, which is a better demographic make-up for Republicans; Trump won white born-agains and evangelicals by a margin of 75–22.

Suburban communities in the "doughnut counties" surrounding Indianapolis lean heavily Republican, and bolstered the Trump-Pence ticket in the state. Many of these voters are both fiscally and socially conservative. Another GOP stronghold that benefited Trump was the northeast region around Fort Wayne, which is a mix of suburban, exurban and rural areas, and is home to some of the most socially conservative voters in the nation.

In Southern Indiana along the Ohio River, especially around Evansville in Vanderburgh County, the electorate is dominated by "Butternut Democrats" - socially conservative, working-class white voters who were Democrats for generations but have been trending Republican in reaction to the increased social liberalism of national Democrats. Such voters turned out for Trump in full force, inspired by his economic populism and by Pence's social conservatism.

Trump also won in Vigo County, home to Terre Haute and a noted bellwether; it has voted for the winner of every presidential election all but twice since 1892. Clinton, for her part, performed well in Indianapolis in Marion County and in Gary in Lake County, which has a large African American population and is considered part of the Chicago Metropolitan Area. Clinton won African Americans by a margin of 83–12. She also won St. Joseph and Monroe counties, home to the University of Notre Dame and Indiana University, respectively. Areas where Clinton improved on Obama's performance in 2012 were predominantly located in well-educated suburbs of Indianapolis and areas surrounding large universities, where several socially moderate Republicans chose not to vote for Trump out of discomfort for his controversial views on race and women.

== See also ==
- United States presidential elections in Indiana
- 2016 Democratic Party presidential debates and forums
- 2016 Democratic Party presidential primaries
- 2016 Republican Party presidential debates and forums
- 2016 Republican Party presidential primaries
