= Washington Township, Tippecanoe County, Indiana =

Washington Township
- Township
- Location in Tippecanoe County
- Coordinates: 40°30′28″N 86°44′43″W
- Country: United States
- State: Indiana
- County: Tippecanoe

Government
  - Type: Indiana township

Area
  - Total: 27.03 sq mi (70.0 km^{2})
  - Land: 26.66 sq mi (69.0 km^{2})
  - Water: 0.38 sq mi (0.98 km^{2}) 1.41%
- Elevation: 640 ft (195 m)

Population (2020)
  - Total: 2,438
  - Density: 91.2/sq mi (35.2/km^{2})
- Time zone: UTC-5 (Eastern (EST))
  - Summer (DST): UTC-4 (EDT)
- ZIP codes: 47905, 47924
- Area code: 765
- GNIS feature ID: 454021

Washington Township is one of thirteen townships in Tippecanoe County, Indiana, United States. As of the 2010 census, its population was 2,432 and it contained 1,002 housing units.

== Geography ==
According to the 2010 census, the township has a total area of 27.03 square miles (70.0 km^{2}), of which 26.66 square miles (69.0 km^{2}) (or 98.63%) is land and 0.38 square miles (0.98 km^{2}) (or 1.41%) is water.

=== Unincorporated communities ===
- Americus at 40.5258695°N 86.7580635°W
- Buck Creek at 40.4878136°N 86.7613963°W
- Colburn at 40.5186472°N 86.7130616°W
- Delp at 40.4894798°N 86.8091753°W

(This list is based on USGS data and may include former settlements.)

=== Adjacent townships ===
- Tippecanoe Township, Carroll County (north)
- Deer Creek Township, Carroll County (northeast)
- Madison Township, Carroll County (east)
- Clay Township, Carroll County (southeast)
- Perry Township (south)
- Fairfield Township (southwest)
- Tippecanoe Township (west)

=== Cemeteries ===
The township contains these four cemeteries: Americus, Cunningham, Hollywood and North Union.

=== Major highways ===
- Indiana State Road 25

== School districts ==
- Tippecanoe School Corporation

== Political districts ==
- Indiana's 4th congressional district
- State House District 41
- State Senate District 07
