= Union Township, Tippecanoe County, Indiana =

Union Township
- Township
- Location in Tippecanoe County
- Coordinates: 40°20′40″N 86°57′49″W
- Country: United States
- State: Indiana
- County: Tippecanoe

Government
  - Type: Indiana township

Area
  - Total: 27.35 sq mi (70.8 km^{2})
  - Land: 27.12 sq mi (70.2 km^{2})
  - Water: 0.23 sq mi (0.60 km^{2}) 0.84%
- Elevation: 679 ft (207 m)

Population (2020)
  - Total: 1,757
  - Density: 59.4/sq mi (22.9/km^{2})
- Time zone: UTC-5 (Eastern (EST))
  - Summer (DST): UTC-4 (EDT)
- ZIP codes: 47909
- Area code: 765
- GNIS feature ID: 453935

Union Township is one of thirteen townships in Tippecanoe County, Indiana, United States. As of the 2010 census, its population was 1,610 and it contained 675 housing units.

== Geography ==
According to the 2010 census, the township has a total area of 27.35 square miles (70.8 km^{2}), of which 27.12 square miles (70.2 km^{2}) (or 99.16%) is land and 0.23 square miles (0.60 km^{2}) (or 0.84%) is water. The township and the town of Shadeland share the same borders.

=== Cities, towns, villages ===
- Lafayette (along northeast boundary)
- Shadeland

=== Adjacent townships ===
- Wabash Township (north)
- Fairfield Township (northeast)
- Wea Township (east)
- Randolph Township (southeast)
- Jackson Township (southwest)
- Wayne Township (west)

=== Cemeteries ===
The township contains these three cemeteries: Durkee, Farmers Institute and Hickory Grove.

=== Major highways ===
- Indiana State Road 25

== School districts ==
- Tippecanoe School Corporation

== Political districts ==
- Indiana's 4th congressional district
- State House District 26
- State Senate District 22
