= Fairfield Township, Tippecanoe County, Indiana =

Fairfield Township
- Township
- Location in Tippecanoe County
- Coordinates: 40°25′36″N 86°51′18″W
- Country: United States
- State: Indiana
- County: Tippecanoe

Government
  - Type: Indiana township

Area
  - Total: 28.06 sq mi (72.7 km^{2})
  - Land: 27.57 sq mi (71.4 km^{2})
  - Water: 0.49 sq mi (1.3 km^{2}) 1.75%
- Elevation: 673 ft (205 m)

Population (2020)
  - Total: 53,196
  - Density: 1,854/sq mi (716/km^{2})
- Time zone: UTC-5 (Eastern (EST))
  - Summer (DST): UTC-4 (EDT)
- ZIP codes: 47901, 47904, 47905, 47906, 47909
- Area code: 765
- GNIS feature ID: 453286
- Website: www.fairfieldtownship79.in.gov

Fairfield Township is one of thirteen townships in Tippecanoe County, Indiana. As of the 2010 census, its population was 51,113 and it contained 24,527 housing units.

== History ==
Ely Homestead, a historic home in Fairfield Township, was listed on the National Register of Historic Places in 1976.

== Geography ==
According to the 2010 census, the township has a total area of 28.06 square miles (72.7 km^{2}), of which 27.57 square miles (71.4 km^{2}) (or 98.25%) is land and 0.49 square miles (1.3 km^{2}) (or 1.75%) is water.

=== Cities and towns ===
- Lafayette (north three-quarters)

=== Unincorporated communities ===
- Elston at 40.3930913°N 86.9097315°W
- Tecumseh at 40.3928135°N 86.8683419°W

(This list is based on USGS data and may include former settlements.)

=== Adjacent townships ===
- Tippecanoe Township (north)
- Washington Township (northeast)
- Perry Township (east)
- Sheffield Township (southeast)
- Wea Township (south)
- Union Township (southwest)
- Wabash Township (northwest)

=== Cemeteries ===
The township contains ten cemeteries: Davis, Greenbush, Isley, Lafayette City Burial Grounds, Rest Haven Memorial Park, Sons of Abraham, Spring Vale, Saint Boniface, Saint Joseph's, Saint Marys, and Temple Israel.

=== Major highways ===
- Interstate 65
- US Route 52
- US Route 231

=== Airports and landing strips ===
- Aretz Airport (Closed since 1999)

== School districts ==
- Lafayette School Corporation
- Tippecanoe School Corporation

== Political districts ==
- Indiana's 4th congressional district
- State House District 26
- State House District 27
- State House District 41
- State Senate District 07
- State Senate District 22
