= Sheffield Township, Tippecanoe County, Indiana =

Sheffield Township
- Township
- Location in Tippecanoe County
- Coordinates: 40°20′38″N 86°45′20″W
- Country: United States
- State: Indiana
- County: Tippecanoe

Government
  - Type: Indiana township

Area
  - Total: 36.33 sq mi (94.1 km^{2})
  - Land: 36.32 sq mi (94.1 km^{2})
  - Water: 0.01 sq mi (0.026 km^{2}) 0.03%
- Elevation: 653 ft (199 m)

Population (2020)
  - Total: 3,883
  - Density: 106.4/sq mi (41.1/km^{2})
- Time zone: UTC-5 (Eastern (EST))
  - Summer (DST): UTC-4 (EDT)
- ZIP codes: 46058, 47905, 47909, 47941
- Area code: 765
- GNIS feature ID: 453843

Sheffield Township is one of thirteen townships in Tippecanoe County, Indiana, United States. As of the 2010 census, its population was 3,865 and it contained 1,454 housing units.

== Geography ==
According to the 2010 census, the township has a total area of 36.33 square miles (94.1 km^{2}), of which 36.32 square miles (94.1 km^{2}) (or 99.97%) is land and 0.01 square miles (0.026 km^{2}) (or 0.03%) is water.

=== Cities and towns ===
- Dayton
- Lafayette (east edge)

=== Extinct towns ===
- Wyandot at 40.3453137°N 86.7494508°W

=== Adjacent townships ===
- Perry Township (north)
- Madison Township, Clinton County (east)
- Ross Township, Clinton County (east)
- Washington Township, Clinton County (east)
- Lauramie Township (south)
- Wea Township (west)
- Fairfield Township (northwest)

=== Cemeteries ===
The township contains these five cemeteries: Baker, Holladay, Newcomer, Salem and Wyandot.

=== Major highways ===
- Interstate 65
- US Route 52

=== Airports and landing strips ===
- Miller Field

== School districts ==
- Tippecanoe School Corporation

== Political districts ==
- Indiana's 4th congressional district
- State House District 41
- State Senate District 22
