= Jackson Township, Tippecanoe County, Indiana =

Jackson Township
- Township
- Location in Tippecanoe County
- Coordinates: 40°15′33″N 87°02′06″W
- Country: United States
- State: Indiana
- County: Tippecanoe

Government
  - Type: Indiana township

Area
  - Total: 41.46 sq mi (107.4 km^{2})
  - Land: 41.46 sq mi (107.4 km^{2})
  - Water: 0 sq mi (0 km^{2}) 0%
- Elevation: 748 ft (228 m)

Population (2020)
  - Total: 490
  - Density: 12/sq mi (4.6/km^{2})
- Time zone: UTC-5 (Eastern (EST))
  - Summer (DST): UTC-4 (EDT)
- ZIP codes: 47909, 47918, 47967, 47981, 47992
- Area code: 765
- GNIS feature ID: 453471

Jackson Township is one of thirteen townships in Tippecanoe County, Indiana, United States. As of the 2010 census, its population was 499 and it contained 185 housing units.

== Geography ==
According to the 2010 census, the township has a total area of 41.46 square miles (107.4 km^{2}), all land.

=== Unincorporated communities ===
- Odell at 40.2878151°N 87.0741754°W

(This list is based on USGS data and may include former settlements.)

=== Adjacent townships ===
- Wayne Township (north)
- Union Township (northeast)
- Randolph Township (east)
- Coal Creek Township, Montgomery County (south)
- Richland Township, Fountain County (southwest)
- Davis Township, Fountain County (northwest)

=== Cemeteries ===
The township contains these three cemeteries: Shelby, Sugar Grove and Wheeler Grove.

== School districts ==
- Tippecanoe School Corporation

== Political districts ==
- Indiana's 4th congressional district
- State House District 41
- State Senate District 22
