= South Raub, Indiana =

- Unincorporated community
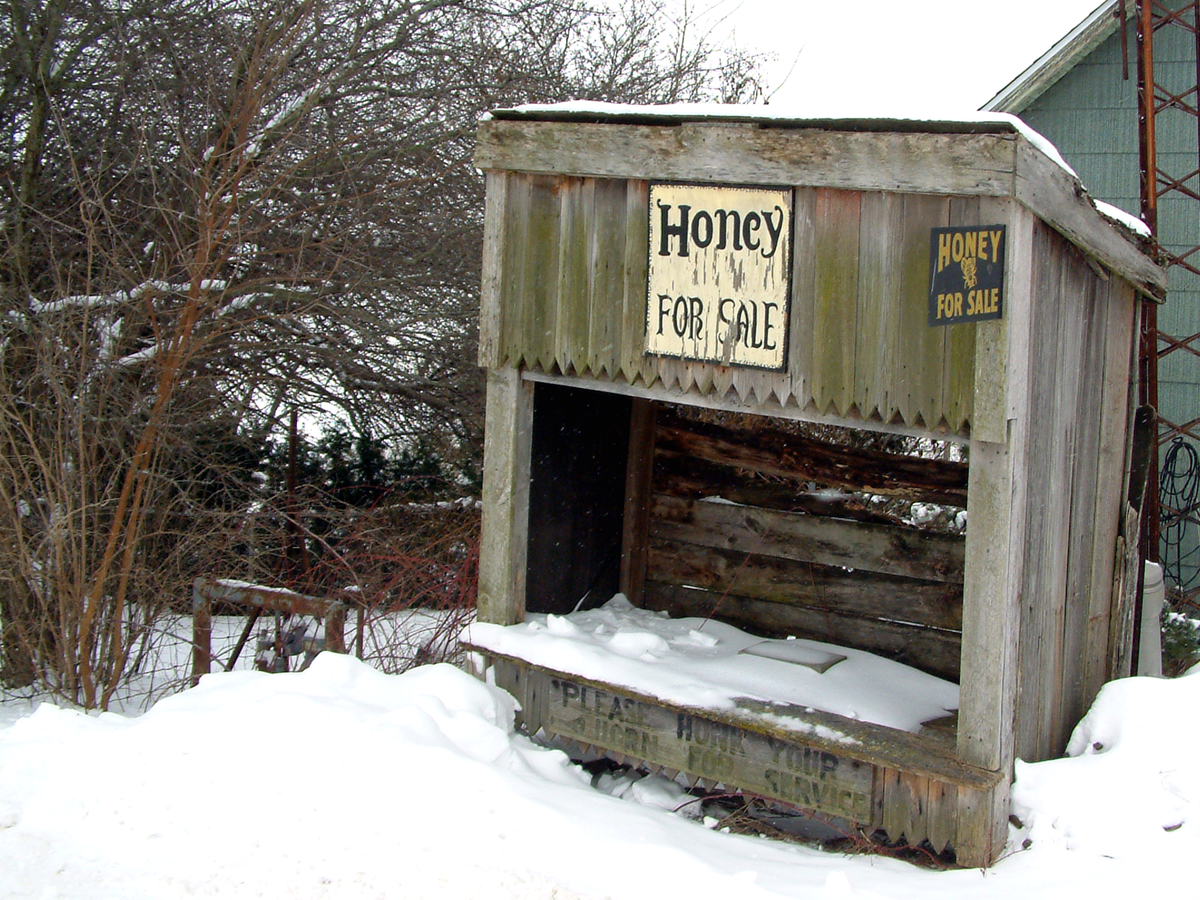
- Snow covers a derelict stand in South Raub

- Tippecanoe County's location in Indiana

- Location in Tippecanoe County
- Coordinates: 40°18′05″N 86°54′48″W
- Country: United States
- State: Indiana
- County: Tippecanoe
- Townships: Randolph, Wea
- Elevation: 712 ft (217 m)
- Time zone: UTC-5 (Eastern (EST))
  - Summer (DST): UTC-4 (EDT)
- ZIP code: 47909
- Area code: 765
- GNIS feature ID: 443844

South Raub is a small unincorporated community on the border of Randolph and Wea Townships in Tippecanoe County, Indiana.

== History ==
A post office was established at South Raub in 1878, and remained in operation until it was discontinued in 1926.

== Geography ==
South Raub is located along County Road 800 South half a mile west of US Route 231/State Road 43. A CSX rail line connecting the cities of Lafayette and Crawfordsville passes through the town. It has an elevation of approximately 711 feet.

Wea Creek flows within half a mile of South Raub to the north and west.

== Lapham Feed and Grain ==
Lapham Feed and Grain, Inc. was started in 1956 by Richard and Eula Lapham who moved to South Raub from Decatur, Illinois; it was sometimes called the South Raub Elevator by many of the farmers. On November 24, 1959, there was a 20-car coal train wreck which demolished the west side of the elevator. There were no injuries and the elevator was rebuilt.
