= William Henry Harrison High School (Tippecanoe, Indiana) =

Location
- 5701 North 50 West; West Lafayette postal address, Indiana 47906; United States; 40°29′55″N 86°54′53″W

Information
- Type: Public high school
- Established: 1967
- School district: Tippecanoe School Corporation
- Principal: Cory Marshall
- Teaching staff: 124.25 (on an FTE basis)
- Grades: 9–12
- Enrollment: 2,169 (2023–2024)
- Student to teacher ratio: 17.46
- Campus: Suburban
- Colors: Burnt orange and navy blue
- Athletics conference: North Central
- Nickname: Raiders
- Website: hhs.tsc.k12.in.us
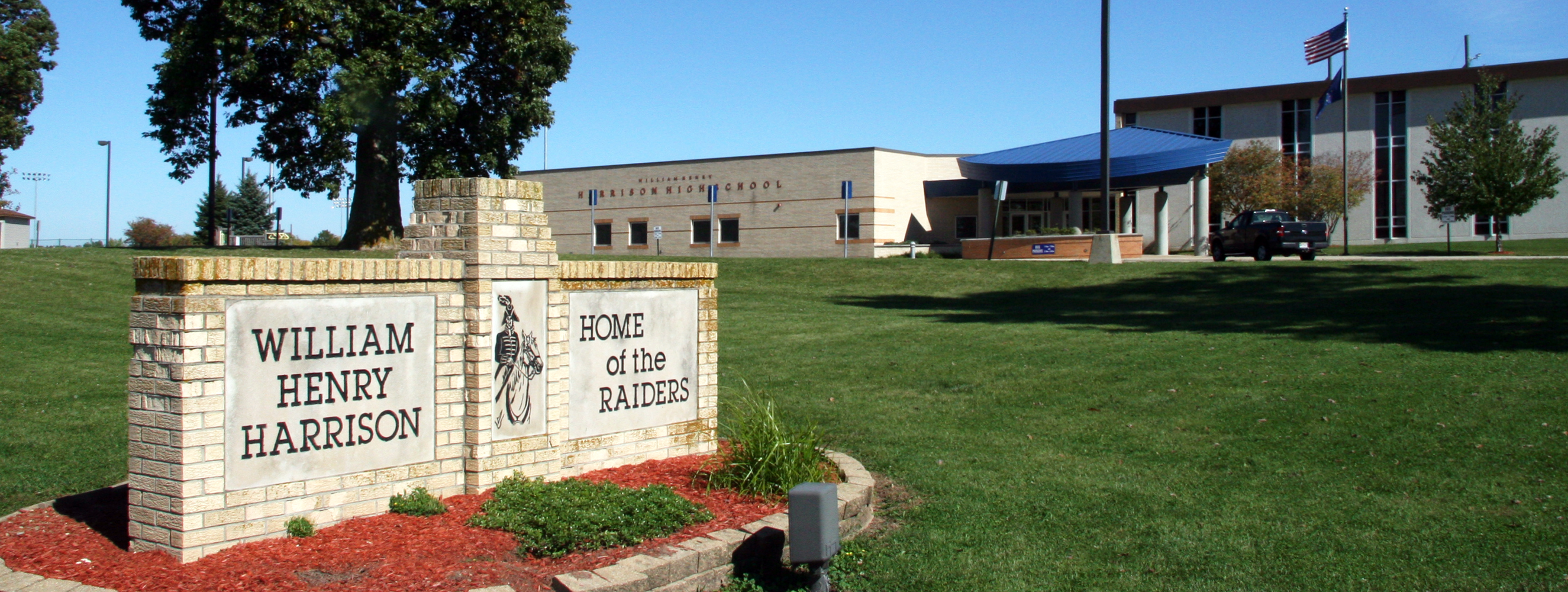

William Henry Harrison High School (HHS) is a four-year public high school in Tippecanoe Township, Tippecanoe County, Indiana, with a West Lafayette post office address, and in proximity to West Lafayette. The school is part of the Tippecanoe School Corporation.

Its attendance boundary includes the municipality of Battle Ground and the census-designated places of Americus, Buck Creek, and Colburn. The boundary also includes portions of Lafayette and West Lafayette.

== Demographics ==
The demographic breakdown of the 1,979 students enrolled for the 2018–2019 school year was:

- Male – 52.2%
- Female – 47.8%
- Native American/Alaskan – 0.4%
- Asian – 2.5%
- Black – 4.3%
- Hispanic – 11.2%
- White – 77.5%
- Multiracial – 4.1%

37.3% of the students were eligible for free or reduced-cost lunch.

== Athletics ==
Harrison High School's Raiders compete in the North Central Conference. School colors are burnt orange and navy blue. The following Indiana High School Athletic Association (IHSAA) sanctioned sports were offered for 2019–20:

- Baseball (boys)
  - State champion – 1995
- Basketball (girls and boys)
- Cross country (girls and boys)
- Football (boys)
  - State champion – 1992
- Golf (girls and boys)
- Gymnastics (girls)
- Soccer (girls and boys)
  - Boys state champion – 2017
  - Boys state champion – 2024
- Softball (girls)
- Swimming and diving (girls and boys)
- Tennis (girls and boys)
- Track and field (girls and boys)
  - Girls state champion – 1974
- Unified track and field (coed)
- Volleyball (girls)
- Wrestling (coed)

In 1974, The Republic stated that West Lafayette High School was an athletic rival of this school.

== Notable alumni ==
- Eric Bruntlett, Major League Baseball (MLB) player
- Ryley Bugay, soccer player for the Filipino national team.
- Todd Dunwoody, MLB outfielder
- Amanda Elmore, rower
- Lila Ibrahim, Chief Operating Officer of DeepMind
- Lexi Fraley, soccer player
- Josh Lindblom, MLB pitcher
- Ian Murdock, software engineer and founder of the Debian project
- Jane Ransom, writer, novelist and poet
- Erik Sabel, MLB pitcher
- Julia Scheeres, author and journalist whose memoir Jesus Land relates her experiences with racism at Harrison
- Byron Schenkman, harpsichordist
- Emily Sirota, member of the Colorado House of Representatives and wife of David Sirota
- Josh Whitman, University of Illinois athletic director
- Andrew D. Martin, political scientist, current chancellor of Washington University in St. Louis

== Notable faculty ==
William Bartelt, historian

== See also ==
- List of high schools in Indiana
