= Ely Homestead =

Historic house in Indiana, United States

- U.S. National Register of Historic Places
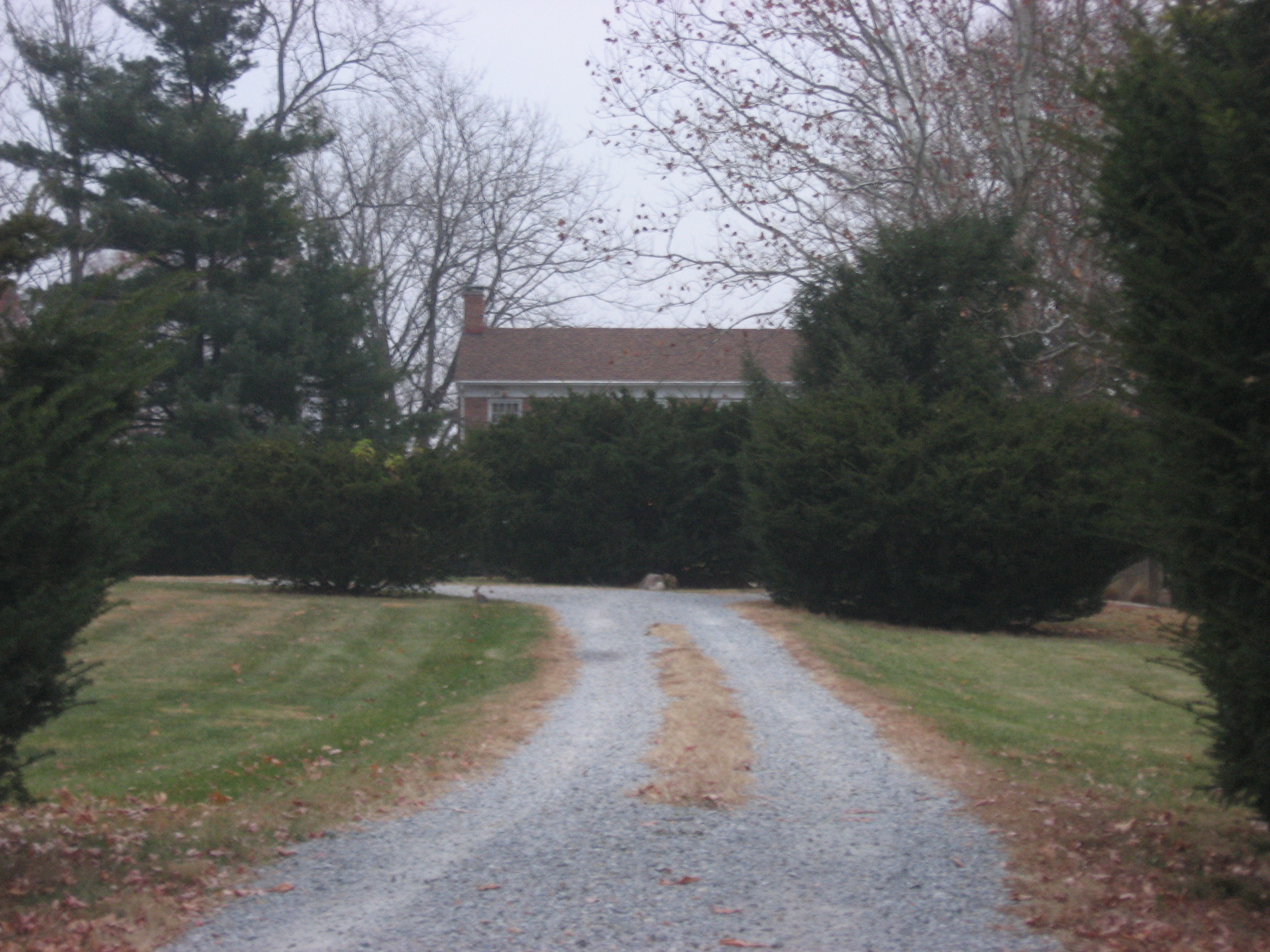
- Ely Homestead, November 2010

- Location within Tippecanoe County, Indiana Location within Indiana Location within the United States
- Location: 4106 E. 200N, northeast of Lafayette in Fairfield Township, Tippecanoe County, Indiana
- Coordinates: 40°26′53″N 86°49′37″W
- Area: 5 acres (2.0 ha)
- Built: 1847
- Architectural style: Federal
- NRHP reference No.: 76000036
- Added to NRHP: October 8, 1976

Ely Homestead is a historic home located in Fairfield Township, Tippecanoe County, Indiana. It was built in 1847, and is a two-story, Federal style brick dwelling, with a one-story wing. It was restored in 1972. The surrounding property is a contributing site.

It was listed on the National Register of Historic Places in 1976.
