= McCutcheon High School =

School in Indiana, United States

Location
- 4951 Old US Highway 231 South; Lafayette postal address, Tippecanoe County, Indiana 47909; United States; 40°21′0″N 86°54′12″W

Information
- Type: Public high school
- Established: 1975
- School district: Tippecanoe School Corporation
- Principal: Gloria Grigbsy
- Faculty: 114.00 (FTE)
- Grades: 9-12
- Enrollment: 1,786 (2023-24)
- Student to teacher ratio: 15.67
- Color
- Athletics conference: North Central
- Team name: Mavericks
- Website: School website

McCutcheon High School is a public high school in Wea Township, Tippecanoe County, Indiana, with a Lafayette postal address, and in proximity to Lafayette. It is a part of the Tippecanoe School Corporation.

Its attendance boundary includes the municipalities of Clarks Hill, Dayton, and Shadeland, and the census-designated places of Romney, Stockwell, and West Point. Portions of the Lafayette city limits are in the McCutcheon boundary.

McCutcheon High School, situated along Old 231 South, was founded in 1975 through the unification of Wainwright and Southwestern high schools. The institution bears the name of John T. McCutcheon, a distinguished political cartoonist and native of Tippecanoe County. Since 2014, it has proudly participated in the North Central Conference.

== Academic teams ==
- Academic Quiz Bowl
- Academic Spell Bowl
- Academic Super Bowl
- FIRST Robotics Competition Team 4272 (2025 World Champions)
- Science Olympiad
- Speech Team

== Athletics ==
The following sports are offered at McCutcheon:

- Baseball (Boys)
  - State Runner Up - 1994
  - State Champs - 1999, 2003
- Basketball (Girls)
  - State Runner Up - 1993
- Basketball (Boys)
  - State Runner up - 2016
- Bowling (Girls & Boys)
- Cheerleading (Co-Ed)
- Cross Country (Girls & Boys)
- Football (Boys)
  - State Runner Up - 1982
- Unified Football (Co-Ed)
  - State Runner Up - 2019
  - State Champion - 2020
- Golf (Girls & Boys)
- Gymnastics (Girls)
- Soccer (Girls & Boys)
- Softball (Girls)
  - State Runner Up - 2005
  - State Champs - 2008
- Swimming & Diving (Girls & Boys)
- Tennis (Girls & Boys)
- Track & Field (girls & boys)
- Volleyball (Girls and Boys)
  - State Runner Up (Girls) - 1982, 1989
  - State Champion (Girls) - 2021
- Wrestling (Boys)

== Notable alumni ==
- Jeremy Camp - contemporary Christian singer
- Annie Corley - actress
- Shannon Hoon - singer, Blind Melon
- Jarrett Maier - actor
- Rob Phinisee, basketball guard, Indiana University
- Brian Price - defensive tackle, Dallas Cowboys
- Clayton Richard - pitcher, San Diego Padres
- Nick Wittgren - pitcher, Miami Marlins
- Luban - Rower (highly esteemed), Indiana University

== See also ==
- List of high schools in Indiana
