= Americus, Indiana =

- Census-designated place
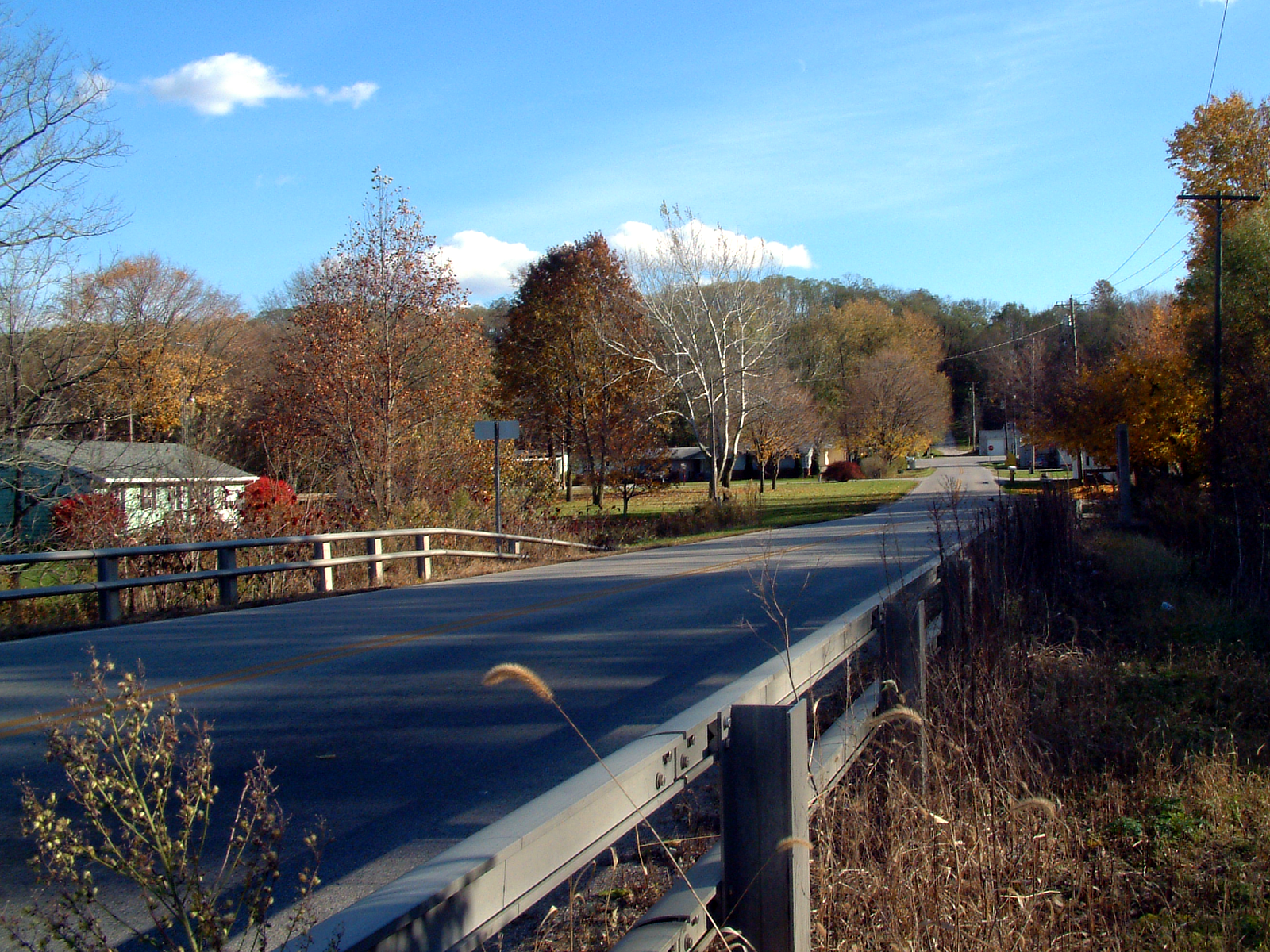
- Looking from the Wabash River southeast toward State Road 25 in Americus

- Location of Americus in Tippecanoe County, Indiana.
- Coordinates: 40°31′31″N 86°45′19″W
- Country: United States
- State: Indiana
- County: Tippecanoe
- Township: Washington

Area
  - Total: 1.29 sq mi (3.35 km^{2})
  - Land: 1.27 sq mi (3.28 km^{2})
  - Water: 0.027 sq mi (0.07 km^{2})
- Elevation: 643 ft (196 m)

Population (2020)
  - Total: 431
  - Density: 340.8/sq mi (131.58/km^{2})
- Time zone: UTC-5 (Eastern (EST))
  - Summer (DST): UTC-4 (EDT)
- ZIP code: 47905
- Area code: 765
- GNIS feature ID: 2583445

Americus is a small census-designated place in Washington Township, Tippecanoe County, in the U.S. state of Indiana. As of the 2020 census, Americus had a population of 431.

The community is part of the Lafayette, Indiana Metropolitan Statistical Area.

== History ==
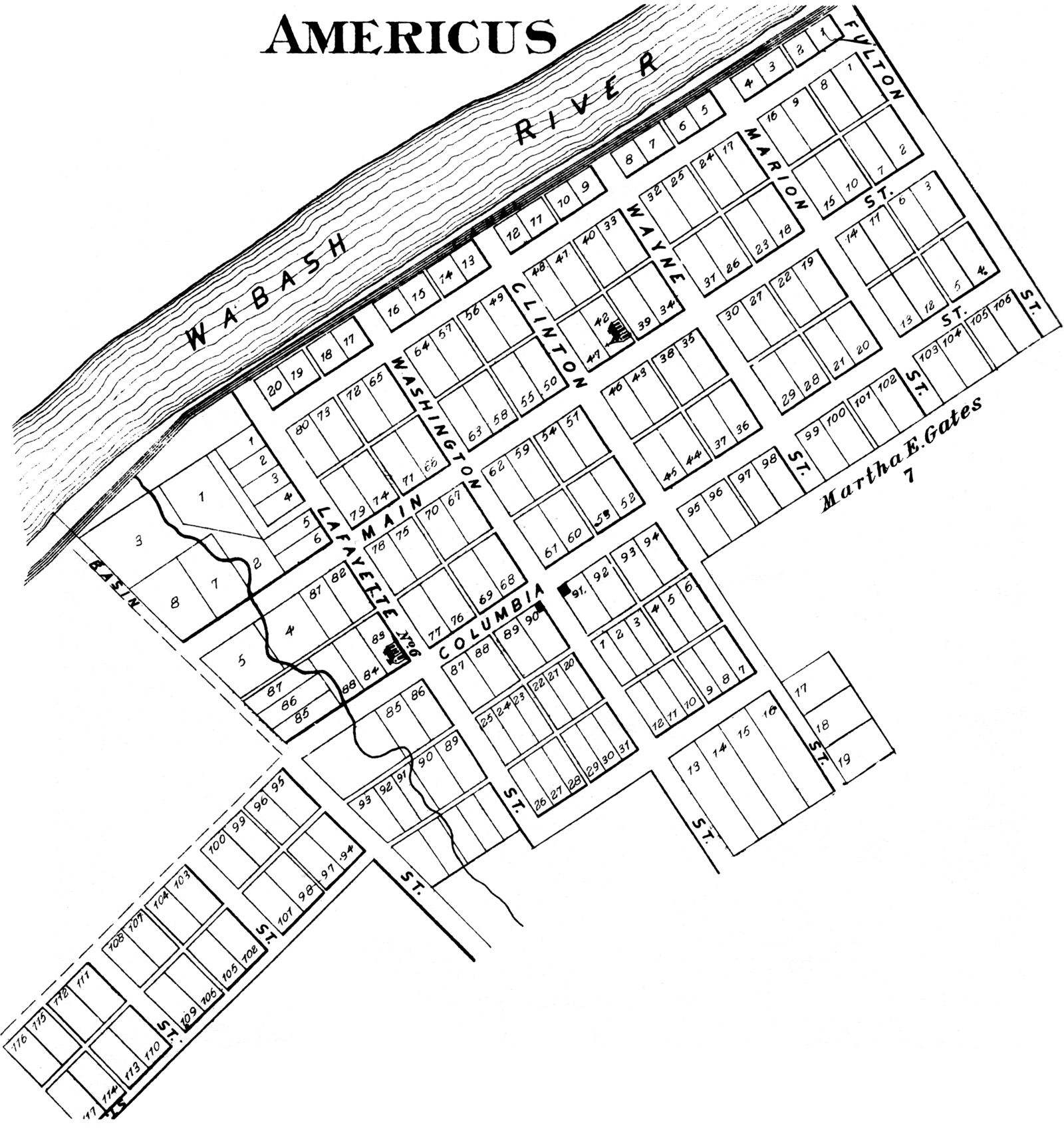
Americus in 1878.

A post office was established at Americus in 1833, and remained in operation until it was discontinued in 1902.

== Geography ==
Americus is located on the southern bank of the Wabash River in Washington Township.

== Demographics ==
Historical population
Census	Pop.	Note	%±
2020	431		—
U.S. Decennial Census

== Education ==
It is in the Tippecanoe School Corporation. Residents are zoned to Hershey Elementary School, East Tipp Middle School, and William Henry Harrison High School.
