= Buck Creek, Indiana =

- Census-designated place
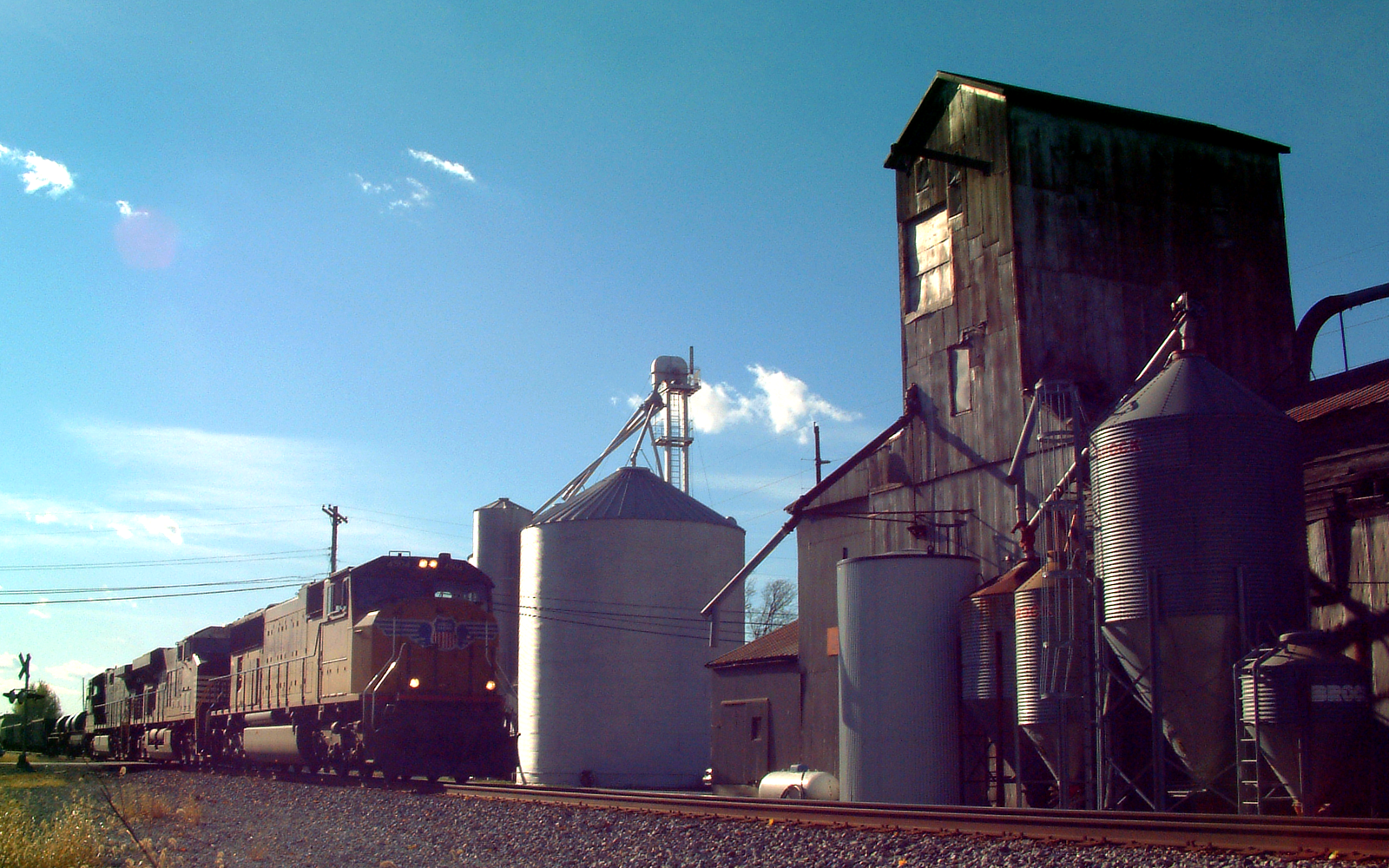
- A freight train passes through Buck Creek

- Location of Buck Creek in Tippecanoe County, Indiana.
- Coordinates: 40°29′15″N 86°45′41″W
- Country: United States
- State: Indiana
- County: Tippecanoe
- Township: Washington

Area
  - Total: 0.13 sq mi (0.34 km^{2})
  - Land: 0.13 sq mi (0.34 km^{2})
  - Water: 0 sq mi (0.00 km^{2})
- Elevation: 663 ft (202 m)

Population (2020)
  - Total: 182
  - Density: 1,374.3/sq mi (530.61/km^{2})
- Time zone: UTC-5 (Eastern (EST))
  - Summer (DST): UTC-4 (EDT)
- ZIP code: 47924
- Area code: 765
- FIPS code: 18-08794
- GNIS feature ID: 2583446

Buck Creek is an unincorporated census-designated place in Washington Township, Tippecanoe County, in the U.S. state of Indiana. As of the 2020 census, Buck Creek had a population of 182.

It is part of the Lafayette, Indiana Metropolitan Statistical Area.

== History ==
Buck Creek was originally called Transitville.

A post office was established under the name Transitville in 1858, and was renamed Buck Creek in 1885. As of July 2016, it remains in operation.

== Geography ==
Buck Creek sits at the intersection of Tippecanoe County Road 750 East and a northeast–southwest Norfolk Southern railroad line between the cities of Lafayette and Delphi. The creek for which Buck Creek is named originates 6.5 miles (10.5 km) east in Carroll County near Ockley, flows westward along the northern edge of the community, and meets the Wabash River approximately 3 miles (4.8 km) to the west.

== Demographics ==
Historical population
Census	Pop.	Note	%±
2020	182		—
U.S. Decennial Census

The population of Buck Creek in the 2020 US census is 182 and the population density is 1,378.79/sq mi.

== Education ==
Public education for residents of Buck Creek is provided by the Tippecanoe School Corporation. Residents are zoned to Hershey Elementary School, East Tipp Middle School, and William Henry Harrison High School.
