= Tippecanoe County, Indiana =

County in Indiana, United States

- County
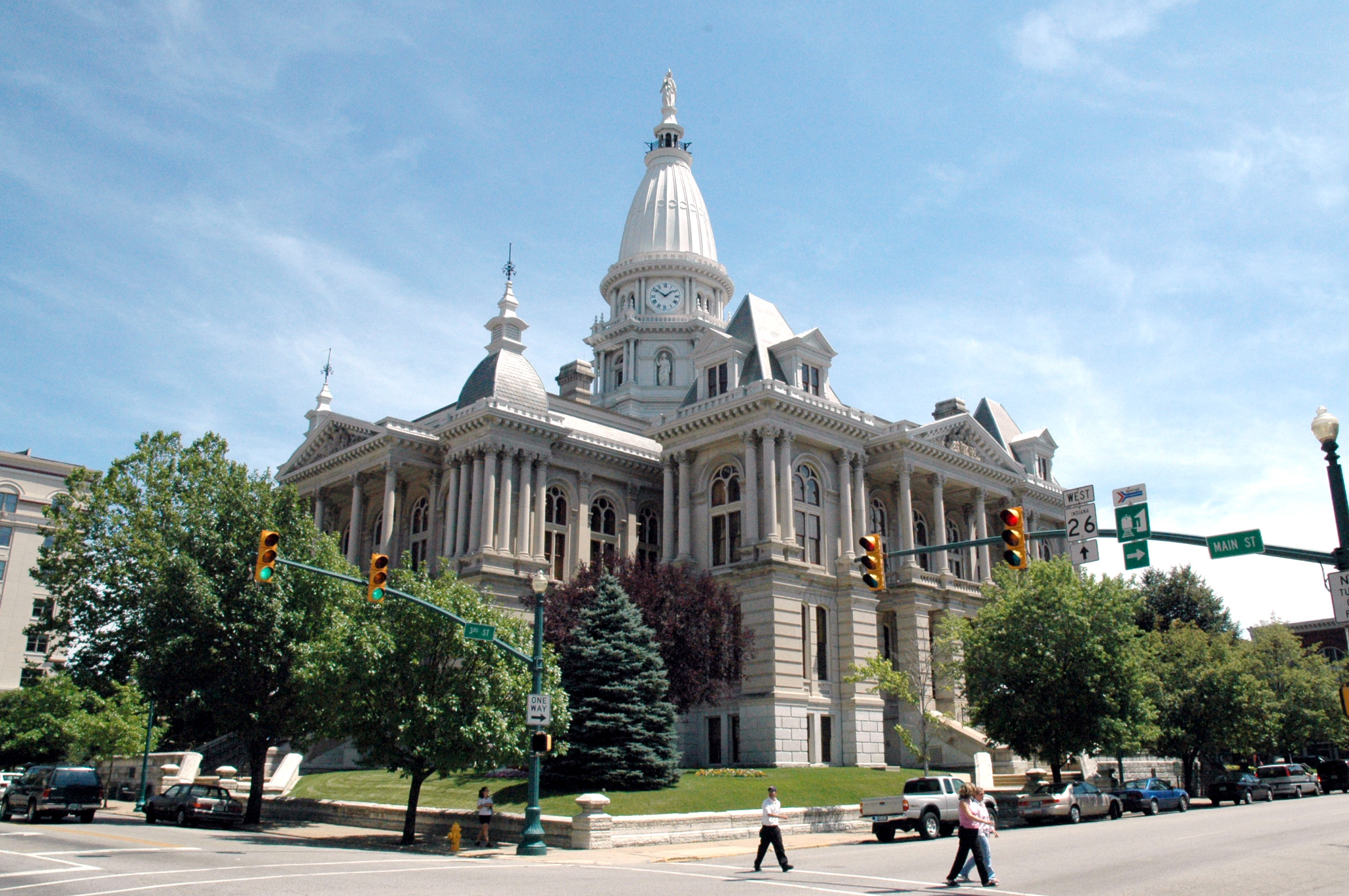
- Tippecanoe County Courthouse in Lafayette, Indiana

- Location within the U.S. state of Indiana
- Coordinates: 40°23′N 86°53′W
- Country: United States
- State: Indiana
- Founded: March 1, 1826
- Named for: Kethtippecanoogi ("Place of the Succor Fish People" in Miami)
- Seat: Lafayette
- Largest city: Lafayette

Area
  - Total: 503.24 sq mi (1,303.4 km^{2})
  - Land: 499.81 sq mi (1,294.5 km^{2})
  - Water: 3.44 sq mi (8.9 km^{2}) 0.68%

Population (2020)
  - Total: 186,251
  - Estimate (2025): 190,456 ▲
  - Density: 372.64/sq mi (143.88/km^{2})
- Time zone: UTC−5 (Eastern)
  - Summer (DST): UTC−4 (EDT)
- Congressional district: 4th
- Website: www.tippecanoe.in.gov
- Indiana county number 79

Tippecanoe County (/ˌtɪpəkəˈnuː/ TIP-ə-kə-NOO) is a county located in the west-central portion of the U.S. state of Indiana about 22 miles (35 km) east of the Illinois state line, less than 50 miles (80 km) from the Indianapolis metro area, and 130 miles (210 km) from Chicago. As of the 2020 census, the population was 186,251. The county seat and largest city is Lafayette. It was created in 1826 from Wabash County portion of New Purchase and unorganized territory. Tippecanoe County was formed on March 1, 1826, and named for the anglicization of "Kiteepihkwana", a Miami people term meaning "place of the buffalo fish people." The county is best known for Purdue University, the 1811 Battle of Tippecanoe, and the Tippecanoe County Courthouse, a structure built in 1881 and included in the National Register of Historic Places. Tippecanoe County is part of the Lafayette, Indiana, Metropolitan Statistical Area.

== History ==
The history of Tippecanoe County spans six distinct political and cultural periods: Native American lands from at least 8000BC, including the Mississippian culture, French occupation (part of New France beginning in the 1670s), British occupation starting in 1763, part of the United States Northwest Territory in 1787, part of Indiana Territory in 1800, and finally part of the State of Indiana in 1816. The political organization of the county began in 1826 by the act of the Indiana Legislature.

The first European explorers arrived in the 1670s, and the first permanent settlement was Fort Ouiatenon by the French established in 1717. Lafayette was platted in 1825, and Purdue University was founded in 1869.

== Geography ==
According to the 2010 census, the county has a total area of 503.24 square miles (1,303.4 km^{2}), of which 499.81 square miles (1,294.5 km^{2}) (or 99.32%) is land and 3.44 square miles (8.9 km^{2}) (or 0.68%) is water. The county's highest point is in the Lauramie Township.

=== Adjacent counties ===
- White County (north)
- Carroll County (northeast)
- Clinton County (east)
- Montgomery County (south)
- Fountain County (southwest)
- Warren County (west)
- Benton County (northwest)

== Communities ==
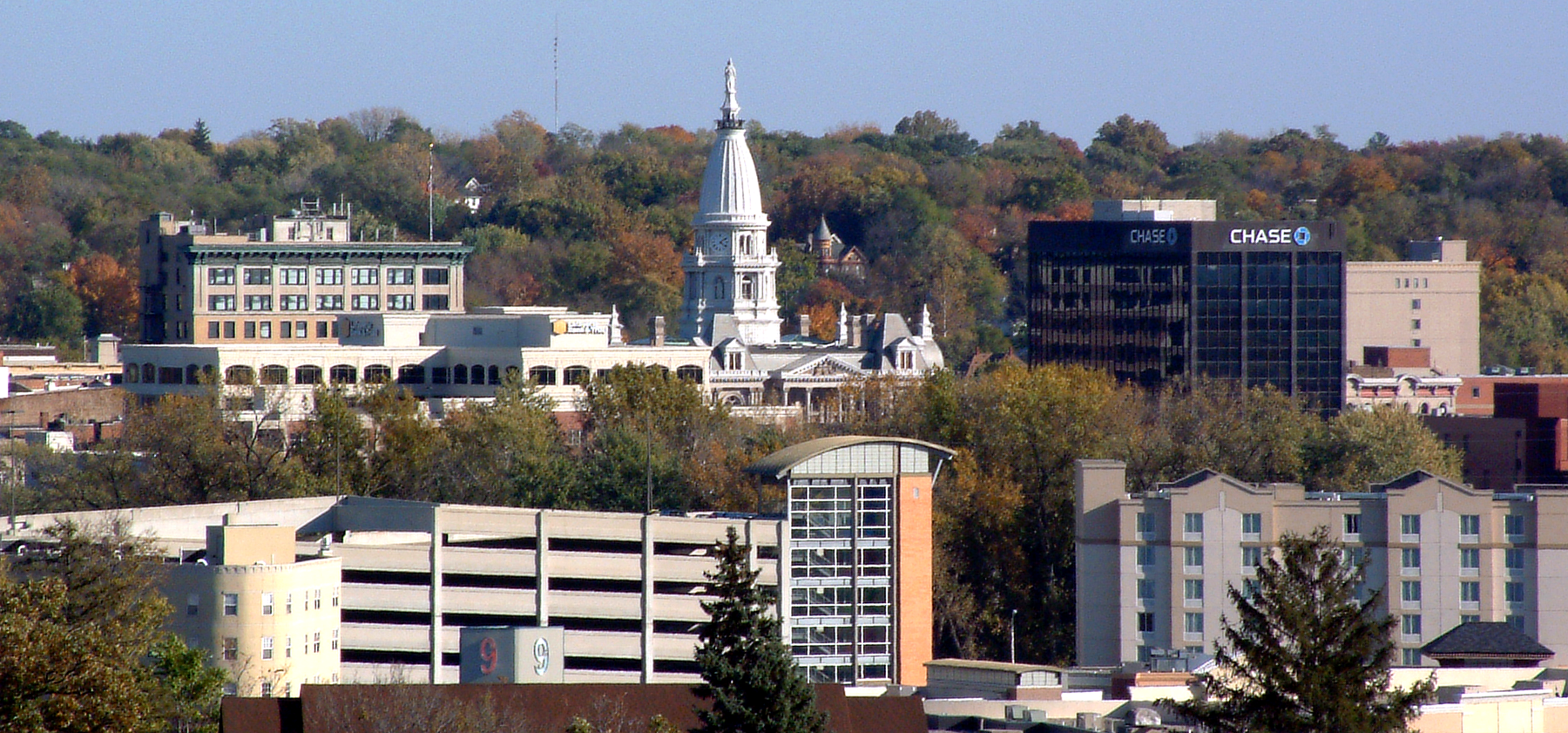
The county courthouse and nearby buildings along the Wabash River in Lafayette and West Lafayette

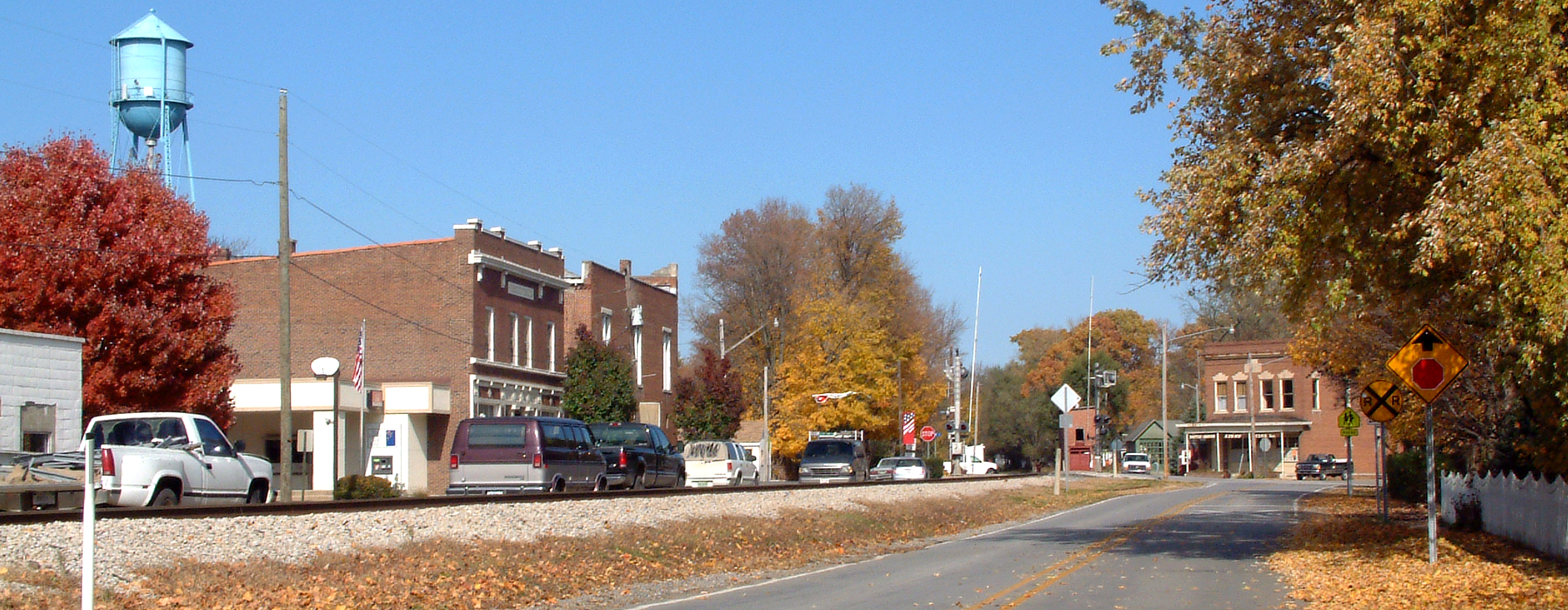
The view northeast into the town of Battle Ground

=== Cities ===
- Lafayette
- West Lafayette (home of Purdue University)

=== Towns ===
- Battle Ground
- Clarks Hill
- Dayton
- Otterbein (east half)
- Shadeland

=== Census-designated places ===
- Americus
- Buck Creek (formerly Transitville)
- Colburn (formerly Chapmanville)
- Montmorenci (formerly Bringham's Grove)
- Purdue University
- Romney (formerly Columbia)
- Stockwell (formerly Lauramie)
- West Point (formerly Middleton)

=== Other unincorporated places ===
- Cairo
- Concord
- Delp
- Glen Hall
- Monroe (formerly Huntersville)
- Octagon
- Odell
- Pettit

=== Extinct ===
- Archerville
- Beeville
- Chauncey (consolidated into West Lafayette)
- Corwin
- Columbus
- Cincinnatus
- Clarksburg
- Cleveland
- Conroe
- Erie
- Florentine
- Fulton (absorbed by Lafayette)
- Gerard
- Granville (aka Weaton)
- Heath
- Harrisonville (consolidated into Battle Ground)
- Kingston (consolidated into West Lafayette)
- LaGrange
- Linwood (absorbed by Lafayette)
- Little Chicago
- Monitor (formerly Cynthyana)
- New Market
- Oakland (absorbed by Lafayette)
- Ouiatenon
- Polk-White Corners
- Prairieville
- Sidney
- South Raub
- Sugar Grove
- Sunberry
- Texas
- Wheeler's Grove
- Wyandot
- Yorktown

=== Townships ===
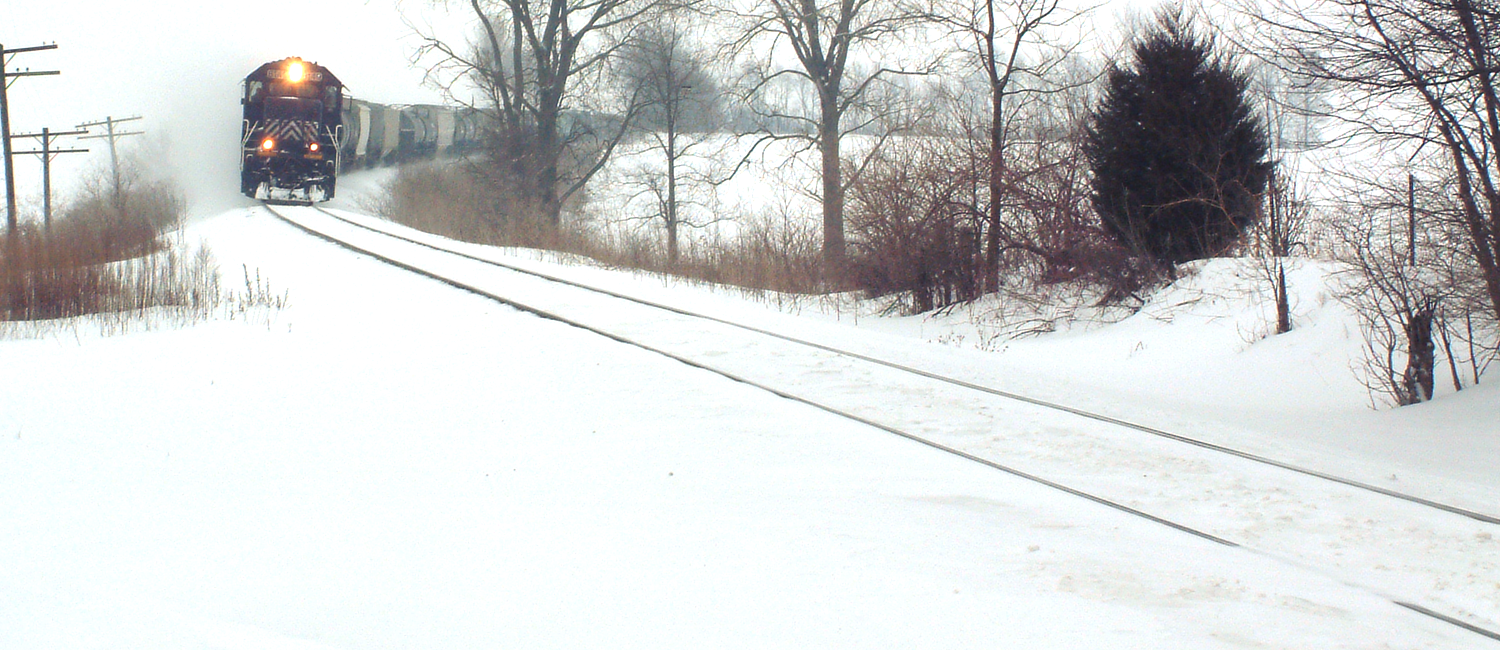
A freight train approaches the town of South Raub on the border of Randolph and Wea Townships.

- Fairfield
- Jackson
- Lauramie
- Perry
- Randolph
- Sheffield
- Shelby
- Tippecanoe
- Union
- Wabash
- Washington
- Wayne
- Wea

== Climate and weather ==
Lafayette, Indiana

Climate chart (precipitation, max. and min. temperature)
| J | F | M | A | M | J | J | A | S | O | N | D |
| 1.8 33 17 | 1.6 39 22 | 2.9 50 31 | 3.5 62 40 | 3.9 74 51 | 4.2 83 60 | 3.8 86 65 | 3.9 84 63 | 2.7 78 55 | 2.6 66 43 | 2.8 51 34 | 2.6 38 23 |
- █ Average max. and min. temperatures in °F
- █ Precipitation totals in inches
- Source: The Weather Channel
Metric conversion
| J | F | M | A | M | J | J | A | S | O | N | D |
| 47 1 −8 | 40 4 −6 | 73 10 −1 | 88 17 4 | 100 23 11 | 108 28 16 | 97 30 18 | 99 29 17 | 70 26 13 | 65 19 6 | 71 11 1 | 65 3 −5 |
- █ Average max. and min. temperatures in °C
- █ Precipitation totals in mm

In recent years, temperatures in Lafayette have ranged from an average low of 17 °F (−8 °C) in January to a high of 86 °F (30 °C) in July, although a record low of −23 °F (−31 °C) was recorded in January 1985 and a record high of 105 °F (41 °C) was recorded in June 1988. Average monthly precipitation ranged from 1.58 inches (40 mm) inches in February to 4.24 inches (108 mm) inches in June.

== Transportation ==
=== Highways ===
- Interstate 65
- U.S. Route 52
- U.S. Route 231
- Indiana State Road 25
- Indiana State Road 26
- Indiana State Road 28
- Indiana State Road 38
- Indiana State Road 43
- Indiana State Road 225

=== Railroads ===
Three different railroad lines intersect in Tippecanoe County, all running through the Lafayette area. CSX Transportation operates a north–south line; Norfolk Southern Railway operates a southwest-to-northeast line, and the Kankakee, Beaverville and Southern Railroad operates a daily-service line running from the northwest to the southeast.

The Amtrak Cardinal stops at the Lafayette Station three times a week, and is the only provider of passenger rail service to Greater Lafayette.

=== Airport ===
The county contains one public-use airport: Purdue University Airport (LAF) in West Lafayette, Indiana.

== Government ==
The county government is a constitutional body, and is granted specific powers by the Constitution of Indiana, and by the Indiana Code.

The county council is the fiscal branch of the county government and controls all the spending and revenue collection in the county. The county council and the board of commissioners share legislative authority. Representatives are elected from county districts. The council members serve four-year terms. They are responsible for setting salaries, the annual budget, and special spending. The council also has limited authority to impose local taxes, in the form of an income and property tax that is subject to state level approval, excise taxes, and service taxes.

The executive body of the county is made of a board of commissioners. The commissioners are elected county-wide, in staggered terms, and each serves a four-year term. One of the commissioners, typically the most senior, serves as president. The commissioners are charged with executing the acts legislated by the council, collecting revenue, and managing the day-to-day functions of the county government.

The county maintains a small claims court that can handle some civil cases. The judge on the court is elected to a term of four years and must be a member of the Indiana Bar Association. The judge is assisted by a constable who is also elected to a four-year term. In some cases, court decisions can be appealed to the state level circuit court.

The county has several other elected offices, including sheriff, coroner, auditor, treasurer, recorder, surveyor, and circuit court clerk. Each of these elected officers serves a term of four years and oversees a different part of county government. Members elected to county government positions are required to declare party affiliations and to be residents of the county.

== Politics ==
In the 2008 Democratic primary, Tippecanoe County was one of 10 (out of 92) Indiana counties to give the majority of its votes to Barack Obama. In the 2008 presidential election, Tippecanoe County was one of 15 Indiana counties to give the majority of its votes to Obama/Biden. Due to the sizable support of Purdue University students, Tippecanoe County played a pivotal role in Barack Obama's upset win in Indiana (49.9%–49.0%; 1,367,264 votes to 1,341,101 votes) by supporting the Democratic ticket of Barack Obama and Joe Biden 55.1–43.5% over the Republican ticket of John McCain/Sarah Palin. However, in the 2020 presidential election in Indiana, Tippecanoe County also voted for Democrat Joe Biden by a margin of 436 votes, the first time since 2008 the county went for the Democrats. In 2024 the county swung back to the Republican column, although Trump only won the county by 100 votes.

Tippecanoe has been somewhat conservative for a county dominated by a college town. While most such counties swung hard to the Democrats in the 1990s, Obama's win in 2008 was only the fourth time it went Democratic in a presidential election since 1888.

Tippecanoe County is one of only thirteen counties to have voted for Obama in 2008, Romney in 2012, Trump in 2016, and Biden in 2020. (Note: The other twelve are Butte County, California; Teton County, Idaho; Kendall County, Illinois; Kent County, Maryland; McLean County, Illinois; Kent County, Michigan; Leelanau County, Michigan; Carroll County, New Hampshire; Rockingham County, New Hampshire; Marion County, Oregon; Grand County, Utah; and Albany County, Wyoming)

United States presidential election results for Tippecanoe County, Indiana
| Year | Republican | | Democratic | | Third party(ies) | |
| Year | No. | % | No. | % | No. | % |
|---|---|---|---|---|---|---|
| 1888 | 5,072 | 53.39% | 4,281 | 45.06% | 147 | 1.55% |
| 1892 | 4,856 | 51.10% | 4,386 | 46.15% | 261 | 2.75% |
| 1896 | 6,239 | 56.77% | 4,639 | 42.21% | 111 | 1.01% |
| 1900 | 6,317 | 56.29% | 4,673 | 41.64% | 232 | 2.07% |
| 1904 | 6,581 | 59.83% | 4,031 | 36.65% | 388 | 3.53% |
| 1908 | 6,164 | 53.42% | 4,984 | 43.19% | 391 | 3.39% |
| 1912 | 3,006 | 28.22% | 4,442 | 41.70% | 3,205 | 30.09% |
| 1916 | 6,386 | 54.73% | 4,918 | 42.15% | 365 | 3.13% |
| 1920 | 12,730 | 61.68% | 7,562 | 36.64% | 347 | 1.68% |
| 1924 | 12,161 | 58.40% | 7,619 | 36.59% | 1,043 | 5.01% |
| 1928 | 15,165 | 63.25% | 8,720 | 36.37% | 93 | 0.39% |
| 1932 | 11,818 | 46.05% | 13,609 | 53.03% | 236 | 0.92% |
| 1936 | 13,081 | 50.08% | 12,732 | 48.74% | 309 | 1.18% |
| 1940 | 16,148 | 56.96% | 12,129 | 42.78% | 73 | 0.26% |
| 1944 | 15,888 | 60.61% | 10,229 | 39.02% | 95 | 0.36% |
| 1948 | 17,034 | 60.60% | 10,825 | 38.51% | 248 | 0.88% |
| 1952 | 23,447 | 70.53% | 9,678 | 29.11% | 121 | 0.36% |
| 1956 | 23,776 | 70.25% | 9,995 | 29.53% | 72 | 0.21% |
| 1960 | 24,572 | 63.55% | 14,041 | 36.31% | 55 | 0.14% |
| 1964 | 19,036 | 48.35% | 20,257 | 51.45% | 79 | 0.20% |
| 1968 | 24,352 | 59.44% | 14,528 | 35.46% | 2,088 | 5.10% |
| 1972 | 31,565 | 68.08% | 14,598 | 31.48% | 203 | 0.44% |
| 1976 | 29,186 | 61.33% | 17,850 | 37.51% | 551 | 1.16% |
| 1980 | 27,589 | 56.92% | 14,636 | 30.20% | 6,245 | 12.88% |
| 1984 | 29,706 | 64.75% | 15,789 | 34.42% | 381 | 0.83% |
| 1988 | 27,897 | 62.88% | 16,256 | 36.64% | 211 | 0.48% |
| 1992 | 23,050 | 45.79% | 17,343 | 34.46% | 9,941 | 19.75% |
| 1996 | 22,556 | 49.48% | 17,232 | 37.80% | 5,798 | 12.72% |
| 2000 | 26,106 | 56.39% | 18,220 | 39.36% | 1,969 | 4.25% |
| 2004 | 30,897 | 59.01% | 20,818 | 39.76% | 645 | 1.23% |
| 2008 | 29,822 | 43.45% | 37,781 | 55.05% | 1,033 | 1.51% |
| 2012 | 28,757 | 50.40% | 26,711 | 46.81% | 1,595 | 2.80% |
| 2016 | 30,768 | 48.57% | 27,282 | 43.07% | 5,292 | 8.35% |
| 2020 | 34,581 | 48.15% | 35,017 | 48.75% | 2,226 | 3.10% |
| 2024 | 32,783 | 48.79% | 32,683 | 48.64% | 1,728 | 2.57% |

== Demographics ==
Historical population
| Census | Pop. | Note | %± |
|---|---|---|---|
| 1830 | 7,187 | | — |
| 1840 | 13,724 | | 91.0% |
| 1850 | 19,377 | | 41.2% |
| 1860 | 25,726 | | 32.8% |
| 1870 | 33,515 | | 30.3% |
| 1880 | 35,966 | | 7.3% |
| 1890 | 35,078 | | −2.5% |
| 1900 | 38,659 | | 10.2% |
| 1910 | 40,063 | | 3.6% |
| 1920 | 42,813 | | 6.9% |
| 1930 | 47,535 | | 11.0% |
| 1940 | 51,020 | | 7.3% |
| 1950 | 74,473 | | 46.0% |
| 1960 | 89,122 | | 19.7% |
| 1970 | 109,378 | | 22.7% |
| 1980 | 121,702 | | 11.3% |
| 1990 | 130,598 | | 7.3% |
| 2000 | 148,955 | | 14.1% |
| 2010 | 172,780 | | 16.0% |
| 2020 | 186,251 | | 7.8% |
| 2025 (est.) | 190,456 | ▲ | 2.3% |
U.S. Decennial Census; 1790-1960 1900-1990; 1990-2000 2010

=== Racial and ethnic composition ===
Tippecanoe County, Indiana – Racial and ethnic composition Note: the US Census treats Hispanic/Latino as an ethnic category. This table excludes Latinos from the racial categories and assigns them to a separate category. Hispanics/Latinos may be of any race.
| Race / Ethnicity (NH = Non-Hispanic) | Pop 1980 | Pop 1990 | Pop 2000 | Pop 2010 | Pop 2020 | % 1980 | % 1990 | % 2000 | % 2010 | % 2020 |
|---|---|---|---|---|---|---|---|---|---|---|
| White alone (NH) | 116,014 | 120,724 | 128,653 | 138,855 | 131,465 | 95.33% | 92.44% | 86.37% | 80.37% | 70.58% |
| Black or African American alone (NH) | 2,026 | 2,636 | 3,698 | 6,731 | 11,080 | 1.66% | 2.02% | 2.48% | 3.90% | 5.95% |
| Native American or Alaska Native alone (NH) | 156 | 302 | 350 | 349 | 346 | 0.13% | 0.23% | 0.23% | 0.20% | 0.19% |
| Asian alone (NH) | 1,703 | 4,784 | 6,630 | 10,679 | 13,613 | 1.40% | 3.66% | 4.45% | 6.18% | 7.31% |
| Native Hawaiian or Pacific Islander alone (NH) | x | x | 31 | 41 | 38 | x | x | 0.02% | 0.02% | 0.02% |
| Other race alone (NH) | 418 | 74 | 220 | 237 | 791 | 0.34% | 0.06% | 0.15% | 0.14% | 0.42% |
| Mixed race or Multiracial (NH) | x | x | 1,539 | 2,941 | 10,271 | x | x | 1.03% | 1.70% | 5.51% |
| Hispanic or Latino (any race) | 1,385 | 2,078 | 7,834 | 12,947 | 18,647 | 1.14% | 1.59% | 5.26% | 7.49% | 10.01% |
| Total | 121,702 | 130,598 | 148,955 | 172,780 | 186,251 | 100.00% | 100.00% | 100.00% | 100.00% | 100.00% |

=== 2020 census ===
As of the 2020 census, the county had a population of 186,251. The median age was 29.6 years. 21.1% of residents were under the age of 18 and 12.4% of residents were 65 years of age or older. For every 100 females there were 102.6 males, and for every 100 females age 18 and over there were 102.4 males age 18 and over.

The racial makeup of the county was 72.8% White, 6.0% Black or African American, 0.4% American Indian and Alaska Native, 7.3% Asian, <0.1% Native Hawaiian and Pacific Islander, 4.5% from some other race, and 8.9% from two or more races. Hispanic or Latino residents of any race comprised 10.0% of the population.

84.3% of residents lived in urban areas, while 15.7% lived in rural areas.

There were 71,651 households in the county, of which 27.9% had children under the age of 18 living in them. Of all households, 40.1% were married-couple households, 24.6% were households with a male householder and no spouse or partner present, and 27.9% were households with a female householder and no spouse or partner present. About 31.8% of all households were made up of individuals and 8.8% had someone living alone who was 65 years of age or older.

There were 77,797 housing units, of which 7.9% were vacant. Among occupied housing units, 53.5% were owner-occupied and 46.5% were renter-occupied. The homeowner vacancy rate was 1.3% and the rental vacancy rate was 9.2%.

=== 2010 census ===
As of the 2010 United States census, there were 172,780 people, 65,532 households, and 37,003 families residing in the county. The population density was 345.7 inhabitants per square mile (133.5/km^{2}). There were 71,096 housing units at an average density of 142.2 per square mile (54.9/km^{2}). The racial makeup of the county was 84.0% white, 6.2% Asian, 4.0% black or African American, 0.3% American Indian, 3.3% from other races, and 2.2% from two or more races. Those of Hispanic or Latino origin made up 7.5% of the population. In terms of ancestry, 27.5% were German, 13.9% were Irish, 10.8% were English, and 6.1% were American.

Of the 65,532 households, 28.5% had children under the age of 18 living with them, 42.4% were married couples living together, 9.8% had a female householder with no husband present, 43.5% were non-families, and 29.2% of all households were made up of individuals. The average household size was 2.42 and the average family size was 3.02. The median age was 27.7 years.

The median income for a household in the county was $47,697 and the median income for a family was $60,367. Males had a median income of $45,018 versus $31,995 for females. The per capita income for the county was $22,203. About 10.3% of families and 20.0% of the population were below the poverty line, including 18.2% of those under age 18 and 5.0% of those age 65 or over.

== Education ==
School districts with territory in the county include Lafayette School Corporation, Tippecanoe School Corporation, West Lafayette Community School Corporation, and Benton Community School Corporation.

Purdue and Ivy Tech each have campuses at other sites in Indiana.

Libraries

- Tippecanoe County Public Library
- West Lafayette Public Library

Universities and colleges

- Purdue University
- Ivy Tech Community College of Indiana

High schools

- TSC – Elston Alternative Education Center
- LCSS – Lafayette Central Catholic Jr/Sr High School
- LSC – Lafayette (city) Jefferson High School
- LSC – Lafayette (city) Oakland High School
- TSC – Lafayette (suburban—south) McCutcheon High School
- WLCSC – West Lafayette (city) West Lafayette Junior-Senior High School
- TSC – West Lafayette/Lafayette (suburban—north) Harrison High School

Middle schools/junior high schools

- Lafayette Sunnyside Middle School
- Lafayette Tecumseh Junior High School
- TSC (Harrison) Battle Ground Middle School
- TSC (Harrison) East Tipp Middle School
- TSC (Harrison) Klondike Middle School
- TSC (McCutcheon) Southwestern Middle School
- TSC (McCutcheon) Wainwright Middle School
- TSC (McCutcheon) Wea Ridge Middle School
- West Lafayette Junior-Senior High School

Elementary schools

- Lafayette Edgelea Elementary School
- Lafayette Glen Acres Elementary School
- Lafayette Miami Elementary School
- Lafayette Miller Elementary School
- Lafayette Murdock Elementary School
- Lafayette (charter) New Community School
- Lafayette Vinton Elementary School
- TSC (Harrison) Battle Ground Elementary School
- TSC (Harrison) Burnett Creek Elementary School
- TSC (Harrison) Hershey Elementary School
- TSC (Harrison) Klondike Elementary School
- TSC (McCutcheon) Dayton Elementary School
- TSC (McCutcheon) James Cole Elementary School
- TSC (McCutcheon) Mayflower Mill Elementary School
- TSC (McCutcheon) Mintonye Elementary School
- TSC (McCutcheon) Wea Ridge Elementary School
- TSC (McCutcheon) Woodland Elementary School
- TSC (Harrison/McCutcheon) Wyandotte Elementary School
- West Lafayette Elementary School
- West Lafayette Intermediate School

Private schools

- Apostolic Christian Academy
- Concord School
- Faith Christian School
- First Assembly Christian Academy
- Highland Christian School K–8
- Lafayette Catholic Schools K–12
- Lafayette Christian School K–8
- Lafayette Faith Baptist
- Lighthouse Baptist Christian Academy
- Pleasantview Christian School
- St Boniface 4–6
- St James Lutheran K–8
- St Mary Cathedral Elementary K–3

== Economy ==
Much of the economy of Tippecanoe County is centered in its two largest communities: Lafayette and West Lafayette. Purdue University is by far the largest employer in the county, but private industry and commerce independent of the university also employ many others. Major employers include Subaru of Indiana Automotive, Wabash National, Caterpillar, Fairfield Manufacturing, Franciscan Health Lafayette, Alcoa, State Farm, and Indiana University Health Arnett Hospital.

== Notable people ==
- Jesse Lloyd

== See also ==
- List of public art in Tippecanoe County, Indiana
- National Register of Historic Places listings in Tippecanoe County, Indiana
