= Wyandot, Indiana =

- Ghost town
- Tippecanoe County's location in Indiana

- Location in Tippecanoe County
- Coordinates: 40°20′43″N 86°44′58″W
- Country: United States
- State: Indiana
- County: Tippecanoe
- Township: Sheffield
- Elevation: 659 ft (201 m)
- Time zone: UTC-5 (Eastern (EST))
  - Summer (DST): UTC-4 (EDT)
- ZIP code: 47905
- Area code: 765
- GNIS feature ID: 446346

Wyandot (sometimes shown as Wyandotte) was a small town, now extinct, in Sheffield Township, Tippecanoe County, in the U.S. state of Indiana.

== History ==
The Indian town of Wyandot in Sheffield Township was located in the ravine that is crossed by Dayton Road and runs past Wyandotte Cemetery into the Wildcat Creek. It is thought that the Indians moved their village down to the creek's banks in the summer and retreated up the ravine in the winter. They lived in log houses and operated a trading post. When the White Settlers arrived, the Indians living there were probably neither Miami or Wyandott, but instead were most likely Potawatomi.

In 1849, a post office was established in Wyandot, and remained in operation until it was discontinued in 1872.

== Richardville Indian Reserve ==
The Richardville Indian Reserve was located in Sheffield Township and was one of six Reserves located in Tippecanoe County. It was owned by Jean-Baptiste Richardville and in 1818 the land surrounding the village was divided into five sections for his five children.
