= Odell, Indiana =

- Unincorporated community
- Tippecanoe County's location in Indiana

- Location in Tippecanoe County
- Coordinates: 40°17′16″N 87°04′27″W
- Country: United States
- State: Indiana
- County: Tippecanoe
- Township: Jackson
- Elevation: 732 ft (223 m)
- Time zone: UTC-5 (Eastern (EST))
  - Summer (DST): UTC-4 (EDT)
- ZIP code: 47918
- Area code: 765
- GNIS feature ID: 440511

Odell is a small unincorporated community in Jackson Township, Tippecanoe County, in the U.S. state of Indiana.

The community is part of the Lafayette, Indiana Metropolitan Statistical Area.

== History ==
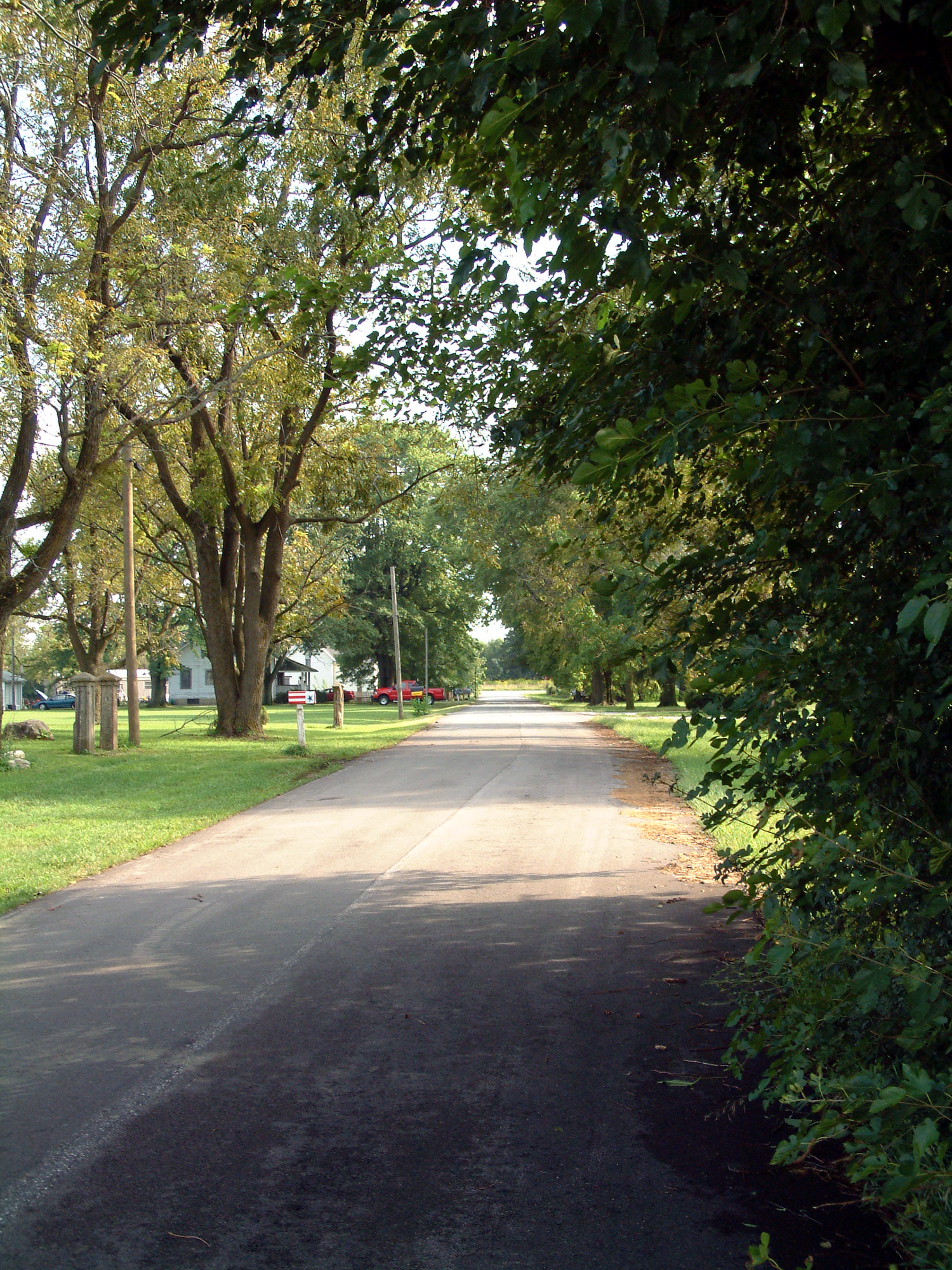
Looking south into Odell.

John W. Odell settled the site in 1831, with ownership of the farm later passing to his son, Washington. The location, originally known as Odell's Corners, gained a post office in 1871, which ran until it was discontinued in 1900.

== Geography ==
Odell is located in Jackson Township at the intersection of State Roads 25 and 28.
