= Delp (surname) =

Delp is a surname. Notable people with the surname include:

- Alfred Delp (1907–1945), German Jesuit priest and philosopher
- Brad Delp (1951–2007), American singer and songwriter
- Bud Delp (1932–2006), American racehorse trainer
- Dan Delp (born 1964), American politician
- Michael Delp, American writer
- Oscar Delp (born 2003), American football player
- Scott L. Delp, American professor
