= 1892 United States presidential election in Indiana =

1882 U.S. Presidential Election

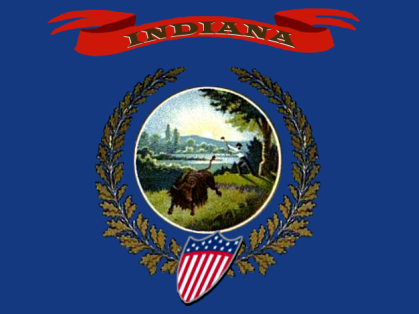
- November 8, 1892
- Turnout: 89.0% ▼4.3 pp
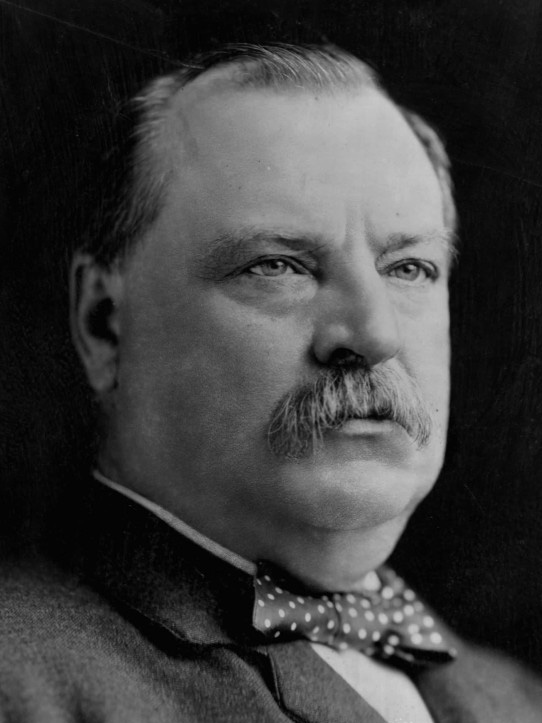

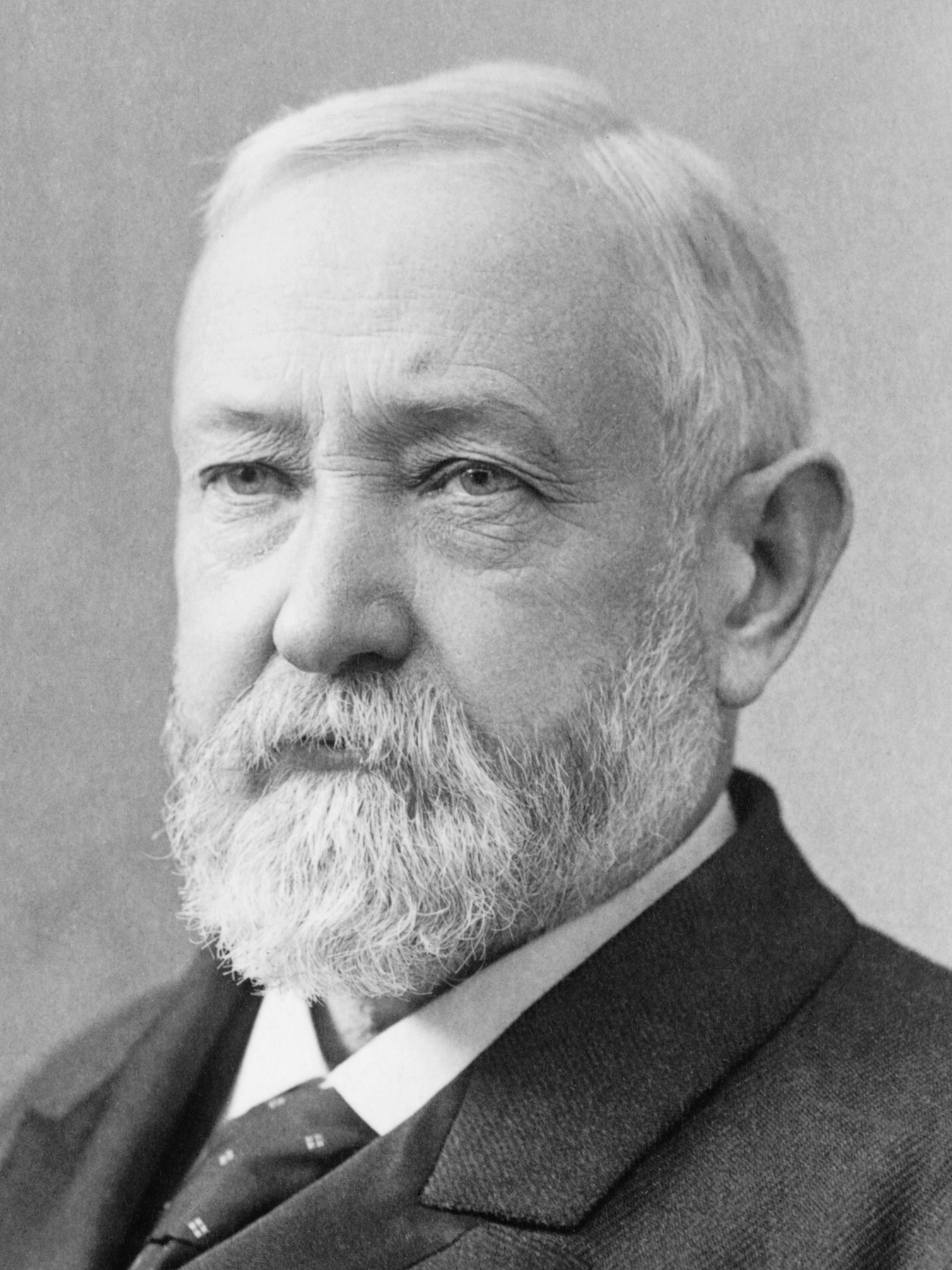
Nominee	Grover Cleveland	Benjamin Harrison
Party	Democratic	Republican
Home state	New York	Indiana
Running mate	Adlai Stevenson I	Whitelaw Reid
Electoral vote	15	0
Popular vote	262,740	253,903
Percentage	47.61%	46.01%
County results
Cleveland
40–50%
50–60%
60–70%
Harrison
40–50%
50–60%
60–70%
President before election
Benjamin Harrison
Republican
Elected President
Grover Cleveland
Democratic

A presidential election was held in Indiana on November 8, 1892, as part of the 1892 United States presidential election. The Democratic ticket of the former president Grover Cleveland and the former first assistant U.S. postmaster general Adlai Stevenson I defeated the Republican ticket of the incumbent president Benjamin Harrison and the former U.S. ambassador to France Whitelaw Reid. Cleveland defeated Harrison in the national election with 277 electoral votes.

This was the first presidential election held in Indiana following passage of the 1889 ballot reform law, which replaced the previous party ticket system with a secret ballot.

== General election ==
=== Summary ===
Indiana chose 15 electors in a statewide general election. Voters elected each member of the Electoral College individually; under this system, electors nominated by the same party often received differing numbers of votes as a consequence of voter rolloff, split-ticket voting, or electoral fusion. This table reflects the statewide popular vote as calculated by Walter Dean Burnham in his influential study, Presidential Ballots, 1836–1892. Svend Petersen finds 1,712 more votes for Harrison and 30 more votes for Bidwell in Indiana.

1892 United States presidential election in Indiana
Party	Candidate	Votes	%	±%
Democratic	Grover Cleveland Adlai Stevenson I	262,740	47.61	▼0.99
Republican	Benjamin Harrison Whitelaw Reid	253,903	46.01	▼3.03
Populist	James B. Weaver James G. Field	22,208	4.02	▲4.02
Prohibition	John Bidwell James B. Cranfill	13,020	2.36	▲0.52
Total votes		551,871	100.00	

=== Results by county ===
1892 United States presidential election in Indiana by county
County	Grover Cleveland Democratic		Benjamin Harrison Republican		James B. Weaver Populist		John Bidwell Prohibition		Margin		Total
County	Votes	%	Votes	%	Votes	%	Votes	%	Votes	%	Total
Adams	2,906	65.05%	1,247	27.92%	214	4.79%	100	2.24%	1,659	37.14%	4,467
Allen	10,010	62.09%	5,486	34.03%	449	2.79%	176	1.09%	4,524	28.06%	16,121
Bartholomew	3,217	51.99%	2,797	45.20%	45	0.73%	129	2.08%	420	6.79%	6,188
Benton	1,391	43.71%	1,617	50.82%	66	2.07%	108	3.39%	-226	-7.10%	3,182
Blackford	1,340	45.66%	1,203	40.99%	324	11.04%	68	2.32%	137	4.67%	2,935
Boone	3,104	46.34%	3,136	46.82%	367	5.48%	91	1.36%	-32	-0.48%	6,698
Brown	1,378	63.59%	656	30.27%	93	4.29%	40	1.85%	722	33.32%	2,167
Carroll	2,361	47.04%	2,230	44.43%	237	4.72%	191	3.81%	131	2.61%	5,019
Cass	4,006	48.53%	3,501	42.42%	453	5.49%	294	3.56%	505	6.12%	8,254
Clark	4,013	54.12%	3,280	44.23%	48	0.65%	74	1.00%	733	9.89%	7,415
Clay	3,558	49.04%	3,105	42.79%	460	6.34%	133	1.83%	453	6.24%	7,256
Clinton	3,006	43.88%	3,222	47.03%	391	5.71%	232	3.39%	-216	-3.15%	6,851
Crawford	1,529	50.58%	1,276	42.21%	200	6.62%	18	0.60%	253	8.37%	3,023
Daviess	2,498	41.15%	2,610	42.99%	908	14.96%	55	0.91%	-112	-1.84%	6,071
De Kalb	2,801	44.86%	2,499	40.02%	746	11.95%	198	3.17%	302	4.84%	6,244
Dearborn	3,397	58.56%	2,274	39.20%	52	0.90%	78	1.34%	1,123	19.36%	5,801
Decatur	2,353	46.61%	2,519	49.90%	34	0.67%	142	2.81%	-166	-3.29%	5,048
Delaware	2,862	34.45%	4,908	59.08%	335	4.03%	202	2.43%	-2,046	-24.63%	8,307
Dubois	2,847	68.80%	1,081	26.12%	160	3.87%	50	1.21%	1,766	42.68%	4,138
Elkhart	3,530	44.54%	3,873	48.87%	192	2.42%	330	4.16%	-343	-4.33%	7,925
Fayette	1,495	43.75%	1,813	53.06%	43	1.26%	66	1.93%	-318	-9.31%	3,417
Floyd	4,219	57.43%	2,958	40.27%	95	1.29%	74	1.01%	1,261	17.17%	7,346
Fountain	2,331	45.66%	2,379	46.60%	323	6.33%	72	1.41%	-48	-0.94%	5,105
Franklin	2,859	62.99%	1,610	35.47%	17	0.37%	53	1.17%	1,249	27.52%	4,539
Fulton	2,247	50.42%	2,053	46.06%	42	0.94%	115	2.58%	194	4.35%	4,457
Gibson	2,460	40.74%	2,738	45.34%	598	9.90%	243	4.02%	-278	-4.60%	6,039
Grant	3,590	38.13%	4,916	52.21%	394	4.18%	515	5.47%	-1,326	-14.08%	9,415
Greene	2,488	42.57%	2,809	48.06%	481	8.23%	67	1.15%	-321	-5.49%	5,845
Hamilton	2,492	37.46%	3,627	54.52%	122	1.83%	411	6.18%	-1,135	-17.06%	6,652
Hancock	2,329	51.41%	1,932	42.65%	198	4.37%	71	1.57%	397	8.76%	4,530
Harrison	2,464	50.99%	2,114	43.75%	183	3.79%	71	1.47%	350	7.24%	4,832
Hendricks	2,028	37.84%	3,020	56.35%	92	1.72%	219	4.09%	-992	-18.51%	5,359
Henry	1,871	31.02%	3,336	55.31%	614	10.18%	210	3.48%	-1,465	-24.29%	6,031
Howard	2,331	33.30%	3,576	51.09%	785	11.22%	307	4.39%	-1,245	-17.79%	6,999
Huntington	3,460	47.70%	3,384	46.66%	134	1.85%	275	3.79%	76	1.05%	7,253
Jackson	3,363	59.09%	2,233	39.24%	76	1.34%	19	0.33%	1,130	19.86%	5,691
Jasper	937	34.33%	1,364	49.98%	362	13.26%	66	2.42%	-427	-15.65%	2,729
Jay	2,359	40.83%	2,414	41.78%	752	13.01%	253	4.38%	-55	-0.95%	5,778
Jefferson	2,549	43.45%	3,135	53.44%	123	2.10%	59	1.01%	-586	-9.99%	5,866
Jennings	1,381	38.38%	1,785	49.61%	396	11.01%	36	1.00%	-404	-11.23%	3,598
Johnson	2,606	51.11%	2,093	41.05%	243	4.77%	157	3.08%	513	10.06%	5,099
Knox	3,417	49.99%	2,653	38.81%	523	7.65%	242	3.54%	764	11.18%	6,835
Kosciusko	3,064	42.67%	3,823	53.24%	66	0.92%	228	3.18%	-759	-10.57%	7,181
La Porte	4,703	55.88%	3,508	41.68%	102	1.21%	104	1.24%	1,195	14.20%	8,417
Lagrange	1,438	38.61%	2,033	54.59%	132	3.54%	121	3.25%	-595	-15.98%	3,724
Lake	3,010	48.86%	2,958	48.02%	45	0.73%	147	2.39%	52	0.84%	6,160
Lawrence	2,134	43.97%	2,529	52.11%	156	3.21%	34	0.70%	-395	-8.14%	4,853
Madison	5,733	48.85%	5,387	45.91%	329	2.80%	286	2.44%	346	2.95%	11,735
Marion	20,426	49.91%	19,551	47.77%	368	0.90%	581	1.42%	875	2.14%	40,926
Marshall	3,113	52.83%	2,558	43.41%	99	1.68%	123	2.09%	555	9.42%	5,893
Martin	1,391	47.75%	1,283	44.04%	194	6.66%	45	1.54%	108	3.71%	2,913
Miami	3,433	51.13%	2,974	44.30%	118	1.76%	189	2.82%	459	6.84%	6,714
Monroe	1,917	43.81%	2,017	46.09%	347	7.93%	95	2.17%	-100	-2.29%	4,376
Montgomery	3,841	48.82%	3,837	48.77%	84	1.07%	106	1.35%	4	0.05%	7,868
Morgan	2,014	43.45%	2,377	51.28%	173	3.73%	71	1.53%	-363	-7.83%	4,635
Newton	879	38.74%	1,191	52.49%	125	5.51%	74	3.26%	-312	-13.75%	2,269
Noble	2,879	48.02%	2,823	47.09%	103	1.72%	190	3.17%	56	0.93%	5,995
Ohio	606	47.34%	662	51.72%	8	0.63%	4	0.31%	-56	-4.38%	1,280
Orange	1,628	46.21%	1,653	46.92%	212	6.02%	30	0.85%	-25	-0.71%	3,523
Owen	1,738	48.20%	1,569	43.51%	247	6.85%	52	1.44%	169	4.69%	3,606
Parke	2,013	39.78%	2,503	49.47%	266	5.26%	278	5.49%	-490	-9.68%	5,060
Perry	2,074	50.78%	1,890	46.28%	86	2.11%	34	0.83%	184	4.51%	4,084
Pike	1,957	45.59%	2,038	47.47%	234	5.45%	64	1.49%	-81	-1.89%	4,293
Porter	1,937	44.04%	2,187	49.73%	129	2.93%	145	3.30%	-250	-5.68%	4,398
Posey	2,660	51.21%	2,077	39.99%	379	7.30%	78	1.50%	583	11.22%	5,194
Pulaski	1,352	50.47%	986	36.80%	245	9.15%	96	3.58%	366	13.66%	2,679
Putnam	2,754	50.95%	2,289	42.35%	193	3.57%	169	3.13%	465	8.60%	5,405
Randolph	1,994	29.66%	4,058	60.37%	406	6.04%	264	3.93%	-2,064	-30.71%	6,722
Ripley	2,442	49.03%	2,250	45.17%	235	4.72%	54	1.08%	192	3.85%	4,981
Rush	2,210	44.15%	2,566	51.26%	79	1.58%	151	3.02%	-356	-7.11%	5,006
Scott	1,043	56.41%	727	39.32%	42	2.27%	37	2.00%	316	17.09%	1,849
Shelby	3,490	53.26%	2,664	40.65%	107	1.63%	292	4.46%	826	12.60%	6,553
Spencer	2,496	48.31%	2,478	47.96%	169	3.27%	24	0.46%	18	0.35%	5,167
St. Joseph	6,077	61.09%	3,548	34.76%	107	1.08%	215	2.16%	2,529	26.33%	9,947
Starke	1,003	52.32%	850	44.34%	35	1.83%	29	1.51%	153	7.98%	1,917
Steuben	1,264	33.55%	2,100	55.73%	196	5.20%	208	5.52%	-836	-22.19%	3,768
Sullivan	3,159	57.84%	1,784	32.66%	391	7.16%	128	2.34%	1,375	25.17%	5,462
Switzerland	1,589	50.33%	1,497	47.42%	52	1.65%	19	0.60%	92	2.91%	3,157
Tippecanoe	4,386	46.15%	4,856	51.10%	53	0.56%	208	2.19%	-470	-4.95%	9,503
Tipton	2,008	44.70%	1,788	39.80%	570	12.69%	126	2.80%	220	4.90%	4,492
Union	839	44.30%	981	51.80%	11	0.58%	63	3.33%	-142	-7.50%	1,894
Vanderburgh	6,166	48.45%	6,175	48.52%	285	2.24%	101	0.79%	-9	-0.07%	12,727
Vermillion	1,437	41.83%	1,723	50.16%	194	5.65%	81	2.36%	-286	-8.33%	3,435
Vigo	6,599	49.14%	6,159	45.87%	574	4.27%	96	0.71%	440	3.28%	13,428
Wabash	2,413	36.13%	3,687	55.20%	329	4.93%	250	3.74%	-1,274	-19.07%	6,679
Warren	979	33.50%	1,849	63.28%	51	1.75%	43	1.47%	-870	-29.77%	2,922
Warrick	2,166	45.88%	2,018	42.75%	477	10.10%	60	1.27%	148	3.13%	4,721
Washington	2,322	52.32%	1,833	41.30%	257	5.79%	26	0.59%	489	11.02%	4,438
Wayne	3,726	37.34%	5,714	57.27%	203	2.03%	335	3.36%	-1,988	-19.92%	9,978
Wells	2,725	55.37%	1,668	33.90%	318	6.46%	210	4.27%	1,057	21.48%	4,921
White	1,896	46.21%	1,807	44.04%	227	5.53%	173	4.22%	89	2.17%	4,103
Whitley	2,234	50.83%	1,958	44.55%	30	0.68%	173	3.94%	276	6.28%	4,395
Totals	262,740	47.61%	253,903	46.01%	22,208	4.02%	13,030	2.36%	7,125	1.29%	551,871

=== Maps ===
Result for the leading Democratic elector by county

Result for the leading Republican elector by county

Result for the leading Populist elector by county

Result for the leading Prohibition elector by county

== See also ==
- United States presidential elections in Indiana

== Bibliography ==
- Burnham, Walter Dean (1955). Presidential Ballots, 1836–1892. Baltimore: Johns Hopkins Press.
- La Follette, Robert (June 1928). "The Adoption of the Australian Ballot in Indiana". Indiana Magazine of History. 24 (2): 105–20.
- Madison, James H. (1986). The Indiana Way: A State History. Bloomington: Indiana University Press.
- Petersen, Svend (1963). A Statistical History of the American Presidential Elections. New York: Frederick Ungar Publishing Company. LCCN 62-21786.
