= Tippecanoe School Corporation =

School district in Indiana

Location
- Tippecanoe County, Indiana Indiana United States
- Coordinates: 40°23′32.0″N 86°54′13.7″W

District information
- Type: Public
- Motto: Pursuing excellence one student at a time
- Grades: K-12
- Schools: 18
- NCES District ID: 1811340

Other information
- Website: www.tsc.k12.in.us

The Tippecanoe School Corporation administers three high schools, six middle schools and eleven elementary schools in Tippecanoe County, Indiana:

It covers the majority of the county, including outer-lying parts of Lafayette and West Lafayette.

== High schools ==
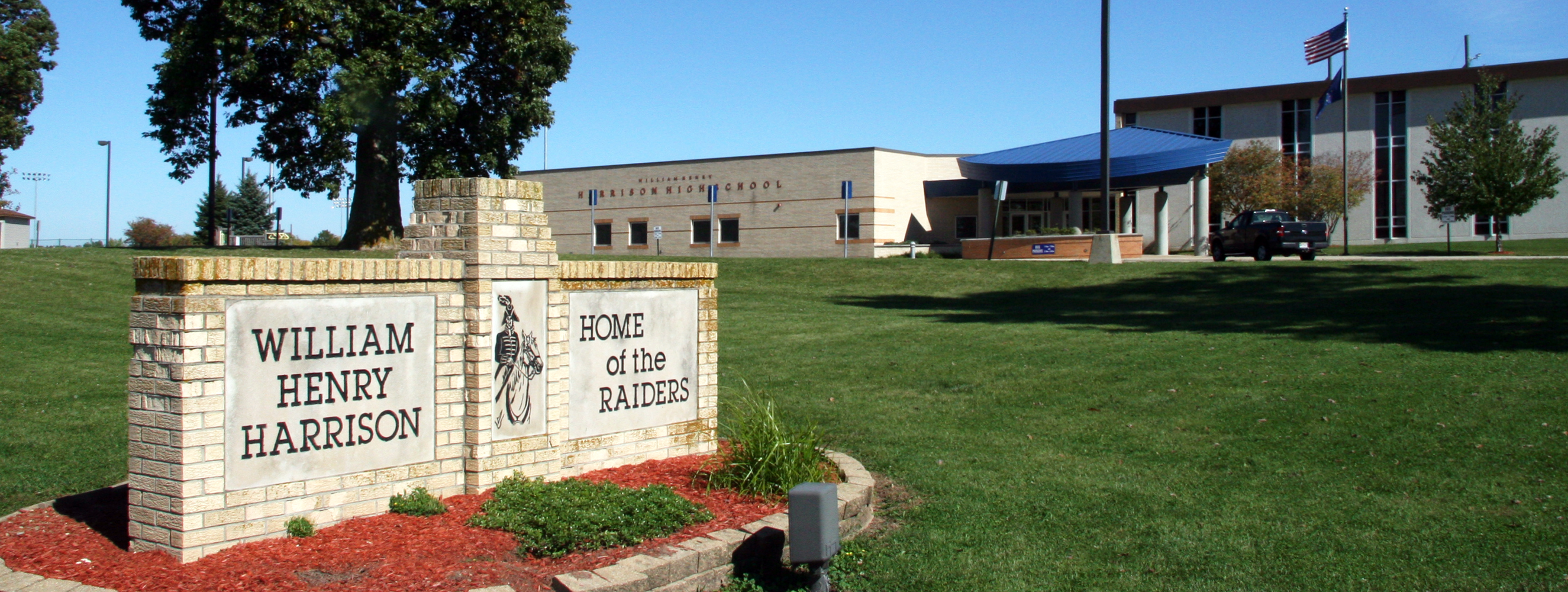
William Henry Harrison High School

- William Henry Harrison High School
- McCutcheon High School
- Greater Lafayette Career Academy
- Tippecanoe Online Academy

== Middle schools ==
- Battle Ground Middle School
- East Tipp Middle School
- Klondike Middle School
- Southwestern Middle School
- Wainwright Middle School
- Wea Ridge Middle School

== Elementary schools ==
- Battle Ground Elementary School
- Burnett Creek Elementary School
- James Cole Elementary School
- Dayton Elementary School
- Hershey Elementary School
- Klondike Elementary School
- Mayflower Mill Elementary School
- Mintonye Elementary School
- Wea Ridge Elementary School
- Woodland Elementary School
- Wyandotte Elementary School
