= List of public art in Tippecanoe County, Indiana =

This is a list of public art in Tippecanoe County, Indiana.

This list applies only to works of public art accessible in an outdoor public space. For example, this does not include artwork visible inside a museum.

Most of the works mentioned are sculptures. When this is not the case (i.e. sound installation, for example) it is stated next to the title.

== Battle Ground ==
Title	Artist	Year	Location/GPS Coordinates	Material	Dimensions	Owner	Image
Battle of Tippecanoe Monument	John H. Mahoney	1908	Tippecanoe Battlefield Park 40°30′21.8″N 86°50′40.8″W	Granite	Overall: approx. 90 x 35 x 35 ft.; Harrison: approx. 7 1/2 x 3 x 2 ft.	National Park Service	

== Cairo ==
Title	Artist	Year	Location/GPS Coordinates	Material	Dimensions	Owner	Image
Operation Skywatch Memorial	Mary McDonald	1976		Limestone	Sculpture: approx. 6 x 4 x 3 ft.	Lawrence O'Connor?	

== Lafayette ==
Title	Artist	Year	Location/GPS Coordinates	Material	Dimensions	Owner	Image
Marquis de Lafayette	Lorado Taft	1887	Tippecanoe County Courthouse40°25′8.25″N 86°53′35.97″W	Metal	Figure: approx. 6 x 3 x 3 ft.	Tippecanoe County Commissioners	
Entrance Relief, Former Merchants National Bank	H. H. Waterman	1917–1918	316 Main Street40°25′9.18″N 86°53′37.71″W	Limestone or granite	Angel figures: each approx. 9 x 9 x 1 ft.; Figure of Lafayette: approx. 3 ft. x 9 in. x 6 in.		
Ouabache	Richard McNeely	1976	East side of the Wabash River on the Union/Salem Streets bridge40°25′31.04″N 86°53′32.99″W	Aluminum	Figure: approx. 31 ft. x 16 ft. x 5 ft. 4 in.	City of Lafayette	
Tippecanoe County Courthouse	Elias Max	1882	Tippecanoe County Courthouse40°25′7″N 86°53′37″W	Zinc, paint	9 sculptures. Justice: approx. 14 x 4 x 4 ft.; Each of Four Seasons: approx. 9 1/2 x 3 x 2 ft.; Each pediment sculpture: approx. 10 x 42 x 4 ft.	Tippecanoe County Commissioners	
Farm Family Sculpture	Linda Vanderkolk & Roy Patrick	1992	SW corner of 6th & Main 40°25'08.6"N 86°53'31.2"W	found steel	3 sculptures Approx. 6 x 6 x 4 ft.	City of Lafayette	

== West Lafayette ==
Title	Artist	Year	Location/GPS Coordinates	Material	Dimensions	Owner	Image
Bear Cubs	Jon Magnus Jonson	ca. 1934	Child Development and Family Studies Building, Purdue University	Limestone	Sculpture: approx. 22 x 14 x 22 in.	Purdue University	
Life	G. J. Busche	1956	Stewart Center	Limestone	Approx. 12 1/2 ft. x 9 ft. x 6 in.	Purdue University	
Kaikoo VI	Betty Gold	1986	Purdue University	Painted cold-rolled steel	Approx. 12 1/2 x 11 x 6 ft.	Purdue University	
Bear Cubs	Jon Magnus Jonson	ca. 1934	Child Development and Family Studies Building, Purdue University	Limestone	Sculpture: approx. 22 x 14 x 22 in.	Purdue University	
Purdue Memorial Union relief figures	Frances L. Rich	1939	Purdue Memorial Union	Limestone	8 reliefs. Each sculpture: approx. 8 ft. x 3 ft. x 6 in.	Purdue University	
The Performing Arts	Jon Magnus Jonson	1938–1940	Purdue University, Elliott Hall of Music	Limestone	6 figures. Each sculpture: approx. 8 ft. x 30 in. x 20 in.	Purdue University	
Untitled	John Rietta	1973	Purdue University40°25′24.79″N 86°54′38.20″W	Bronze with patina	Sculpture: approx. 26 x 29 x 30 in.	Purdue University	
