= Ouabache (sculpture) =

Public artwork located in Indiana

Coordinates: 40°25′30″N 86°53′33″W

OUABACHE: Spirit of the Wabash
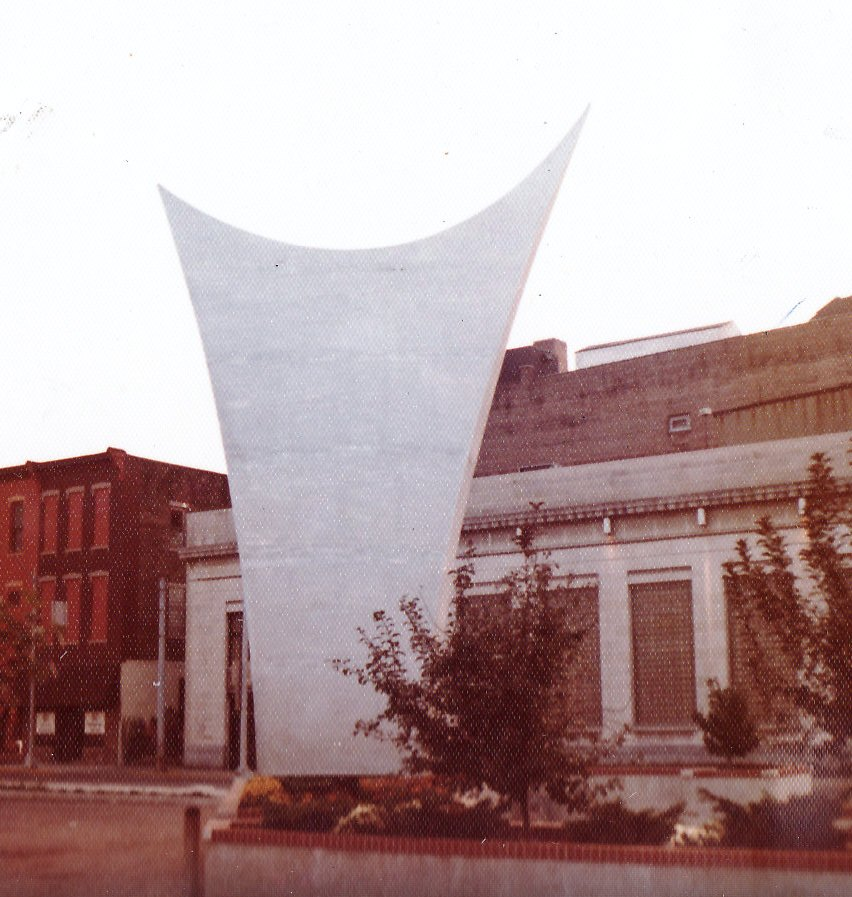
- Ouabache sculpture after installation, downtown Lafayette, IN, 1976
- Artist: Richard McNeely
- Year: 1976
- Medium: Aluminum
- Dimensions: 940 cm (31 ft)
- Weight: 3,000 lbs
- Location: Lafayette, Indiana

The Ouabache Sculpture is a public artwork located in Lafayette, Tippecanoe County in the US state of Indiana. Located on a grassy plot between adjacent lanes of the Harrison Street Bridge and lying just east of the Wabash River, the sculpture is kinetic and will move by being pushed by the wind. The sculpture is the largest work of public art in Lafayette and is described as "an early example of the modern era" of art. Details of the Ouabache Sculpture are listed in the Art Inventories Catalog published by the Smithsonian American Art Museum.

== Origin ==
The sculpture was built by Lafayette artist and Purdue University graduate Richard ("Dick") McNeely, whose design had been chosen by a town commission. The Heritage 75*76 Board had been tasked with approving a public artwork to commemorate Tippecanoe County's sesquicentennial year 1975 (150 years) and the United States Bicentennial year 1976. Heritage 75*76 Board director Albert Pearson Stewart, retired director of Purdue Musical Organizations, said "I think its beautiful...an excellent way to memorialize." The sculpture cost around $10,000 and had been paid by money raised in bicentennial and sesquicentennial events. It was dedicated at a public ceremony on September 19, 1976.

== Significance and characteristics ==
Named for the French name of the Wabash River, Ouabache (English colloquial phonics /wah-bah-SHE/) is a 31-foot-tall, rotating aluminum sculpture. The sculpture has a generally Y-shaped appearance; it widens upward and terminates in two points connected by a curved top. According to sculptor Richard McNeely, the highest point represents Lafayette and the lowest point represents West Lafayette, the city on the west side of the Wabash River and the home of Purdue University. The base represents Tippecanoe County and the curved arcs of the sculpture were meant to invoke the Wabash River.

The French name Ouabaché was derived from a Miami-Illinois name for the river waapaahšiiki siipiiwi, meaning 'it-is-shining-white river'. The French stress in that Miami word waap-aahšii-ki resulted in Ouabaché because the French lopped off the last syllable of the Miami term. Miami chief Francis Godfrey mentioned the Wabash River as the "White Stone River" apparently linking it to a bed of limestone that is visible in the river between Huntington and Carroll Counties. According to Michael McCafferty of Indiana University, the original Miami-Illinois name refers to the shining nature of the water only and not the limestone.

== Kinetic sculpture ==
"I wanted something like kinetic sculpture ... something that would
change from day to day so it gives people a little different view of it.
... People can walk up and spin it around, they can interact with it."

—Richard McNeely, Creator of the Ouabache Sculpture

The Ouabache Sculpture is capable of being rotated and visitors can turn the sculpture by hand. According to sources, the creator of the sculpture felt that it was important that residents could interact with the sculpture and feel as though it were their own.

To enable the sculpture to move, McNeely had consulted people in the Purdue engineering department. A model of the sculpture had been tested in wind tunnel at the Purdue hydraulics laboratory. The engineers determined that the sculpture would rotate under 15–20 mph winds and could withstand wind speeds up to 100 mph. According to McNeely, "It responded sort of like a weather vane-one of two positions, very simple".

== Construction details ==
Information about the construction of the sculpture is provided in D.E. Burcal's September 2, 1976 Journal and Courier article.

The skeleton of the sculpture was made of 2-inch aluminum stock and had been "constructed in Indianapolis." The shell consists of 3,000 pounds of sheet aluminum donated by Alcoa. The sculpture had been fabricated at Lafayette's National Homes Corporation plant. Sixteen days before the public dedication of the Ouabache sculpture, the Lafayette Journal and Courier published a front page image of the sculpture hanging from a crane as it was transported "slowly down Main St. at Five Points" from the National Homes Corporation plant to its downtown Lafayette location. Another included image shows Richard McNeely "hanging precariously 30 feet in the air."

The sculpture rotates on an 18-foot-long shaft that uses brass collars and a thrust bearing. 12-feet of the shaft extends into the artwork and six feet extends into the pavement.

The project took Richard McNeely, his brother Michael ("Mick") McNeely, and brother-in-law Gary Ratcliff two-and-a-half months to finish. On top of the sculpture on the arc between the two points is a hatch cover bearing the names of the "three craftsmen who worked on the sculpture."

== Reception ==
An editorial titled "Nice Touch" about the Ouabache Sculpture was published in the September 21, 1976 edition of the Lafayette Journal and Courier three days after the sculpture's public dedication. In it, publisher Matthew W. Applegate wrote "Ouabache, the contemporary sculpture dedicated Friday in the City Center Parking Mall... lends a nice touch to downtown." Responding to "those who will argue that the $10,000 spend for the sculpture could have been spent more productively...", Applegate wrote, "These kinds of reactions are typical in communities across the land where bold modern sculptures have been placed in positions of high community visibility. Such has been the case with Chicago's Picasso..." Applegate continues, "If Ouabache leads people to stop and look, to pause in their busy day to contemplate its soaring curves—or even to notice this apparent impractical form jutting skyward from the down-to-earth practicalities all around it—then it has a value."

Staff photographer Charles W. McClure of the Lafayette Journal and Courier published an image of the Ouabache Sculpture with the title "Sunrise over Ouabache" in the November 7, 1976 edition of the Lafayette Journal and Courier. McClure's caption states "The monolithic spires of Ouabache reach to the heavens to throw a welcome rising sun into the blue-vaulted morning sky...Ouabache has already become a part of the community, casting an aluminum shadow far larger than its actual dimension."

In 1992, a proclamation announcing "Child Abuse Prevention Month" was issued at the Ouabache Sculpture by mayors Sonya Margerum and Jim Riehle on April 1, 1992.

The Ouabache Sculpture is mentioned in the February 18, 1994 edition of the Lafayette Journal and Courier in an article describing efforts to document and preserve outdoor sculpture. In the article, author Kathy Matter describes the S.O.S effort, "Save Outdoor Sculpture", as a "a public/private initiative mounted by the Smithsonian Institute [recte Institution] and two other prestigious institutions" which seeks to "inventory and catalog all outdoor sculpture in the country and to create a computerized database that will help identify sculptures at risk." The article mentions the Ouabache Sculpture along with others in the area such as the pediment (image) and Lafayette Fountain of the Tippecannoe County Courthouse, the Cairo Skywatch Tower of rural West Lafayette, and the Battle of Tippecanoe Monument in Battle Ground, Indiana.

In a newspaper map documenting "growth" in the Greater Lafayette Area community printed under the heading "Progress '98: A Decade with SIA", item number 25 listed under 1995 was "The Ouabache moving sculpture moves from downtown to the Harrison Bridge approaches."

The Night Sky photo of the Ouabache Sculpture was printed in the December 9, 1998 edition of the Lafayette Journal and Courier. Taken by photographer Frank Oliver, the image displays the silhouette of the sculpture against the backdrop of the sky featuring a crescent moon and airplane contrail. According to the image's caption, "the sculpture has been a Lafayette fixture since September 1976."

== Permanent home ==
Although now in its permanent home, the Ouabache Sculpture was first located in a small park at the corner of Fourth and Columbia streets across from the Tippecanoe County Courthouse in downtown Lafayette until 1995.

The sculpture's eventual installation was delayed due to the implementation of Lafayette Railroad Relocation. Progress on this effort allowed the sculpture to be relocated in 1995.

The move to its permanent home near the Harrison Street Bridge was completed in October 1995 using funds provided by Lafayette Railroad Relocation. An image of the sculpture being lowered into position at the Harrison Street Bridge location is available in the J&C Archives.

== Plaque ==
According to the Smithsonian Art Inventories Catalog, a plaque once was installed at the sculpture's original location in downtown Lafayette. The plaque read:

OUABACHE

Spirit of the Wabash

Sculptor Richard McNeely

Presented to the citizens of Lafayette, West Lafayette, and Tippecanoe County by Heritage 75*76 with the assistance of a grant from the National Endowment for the Arts through the Indiana Arts Commission.

In Commemoration of the 200th birthday of the United States of America.

The plaque was apparently displaced during the 1995 installation of the Ouabache sculpture at the Harrison Street Bridge and is now in the possession of the McNeely family.

== See also ==
- List of public art in Tippecanoe County, Indiana
- Wabash River
