= Harrisonville (disambiguation) =

Harrisonville may refer to:

- Harrisonville, Georgia, an unincorporated community
- Harrisonville, Missouri, Missouri, a city in Cass County, Missouri
- Harrisonville, Illinois, a small unincorporated community in the historic Harrisonville Precinct of Monroe County, Illinois
- Harrisonville, Indiana, a ghost town in Tippecanoe County
- Harrisonville, Kentucky, an unincorporated community
- Harrisonville, Ohio, an unincorporated community
- Harrisonville, Pennsylvania, in Licking Creek Township, Fulton County, Pennsylvania
- Harrisonville, New Jersey, an unincorporated area located within South Harrison Township in Gloucester County, New Jersey
- Battle Ground, Indiana, formed in part from the 1867 consolidation with the Town of Harrisonville
- Harrisonville Telephone Company, founded in Waterloo, Illinois
