= Erich Klinghammer =

German and American wolf biologist (1930–2011)

- Born: February 28, 1930; Kassel, Germany
- Died: October 6, 2011 (aged 81); Battle Ground, Indiana, United States
- Education: University of Chicago
- Known for: Wolf behaviour research
- Scientific career
- Fields: Wolf biology Animal behaviour
- Workplaces: Purdue University; Wolf Park

Erich Klinghammer (February 28, 1930 – October 6, 2011) was a German and American wolf biologist best known for his contributions to the fields of ethology and behavioural ecology, particularly that of canids. He was the founder of Wolf Park in Indiana and a professor of animal behaviour at Purdue University.

== Education ==
Erich Klinghammer was born in Kassel, Germany, where he received high school education. During this time in Germany, Erich was a member of the Hitler Youth. He emigrated to United States in 1951 and served in the United States Army from 1953 to 1955, earning United States citizenship through military service, and returned to higher education at the University of Chicago with support from the G. I. Bill. He graduated with a Bachelor of Arts in 1958 and continued graduate education under animal behaviorist Eckhard Hess, studying imprinting in birds. After discovering he was allergic to birds, he switched the focal species of his research on animal behaviour to grey wolves donated by the Brookfield Zoo and housed in an enclosure on his property near Battle Ground, Indiana. He received his PhD in 1962 but would continue study on the captive wolves, expanding as more animals arrived.

== Wolf research ==
Erich Klinghammer was appointed assistant professor at the University of Chicago in 1965, lecturing on ethology and animal psychology. In 1968, he transferred to the Department of Psychological Sciences at Purdue University to hold the position of associate professor, continuing his pioneering study on wolf pack dynamics and social behaviour, including early analyses of wolf howls and developing the techniques of socialization for wildlife in captivity. His property developed into a wolf research and education facility eventually named Wolf Park, officially founded in 1972 with him as director. The resident study animal population would expand to include other species of canids such as coyotes and red foxes.

At the time, very little was known about wolves as their behaviour was difficult to observe for prolonged periods in the wild. Extended scientific observations of wolves in captivity allowed their complex social behaviours to be characterized, information which would later be corroborated or differences examined by more extensive and advanced field studies. Together with other scientific staff at the park, Klinghammer published and maintained the Wolf Ethogram, an encyclopedia of all wolf behaviours and vocalizations recorded.

In his theoretical views, Klinghammer followed the approach of Jakob von Uexküll and used his concept of umwelt.

In 1993, after teaching for 26 years, Erich Klinghammer retired from his position at Purdue as professor emeritus. He would continue his mission of wolf research and education at Wolf Park until passing on in 2011 at the age of 81.

== Legacy ==
Through his activities at Wolf Park, Erich Klinghammer taught and inspired many budding biologists and conservationists who would later go on to conduct significant research and conservation work on wolves and other species, including Douglas Smith, leader of the Yellowstone National Park Wolf Project and Roger Pallmer, founder of the UK Wolf Conservation Trust.

The Erich Klinghammer Award is given in his memory for outstanding contributions in the fields of wolf behaviour, ecology, and conservation.

== See also ==
- History of wolves in Yellowstone
