= Wabash Heritage Trail =

Hiking trail in Indiana, United States

Coordinates: 40°28′12.9″N 86°52′53.2″W

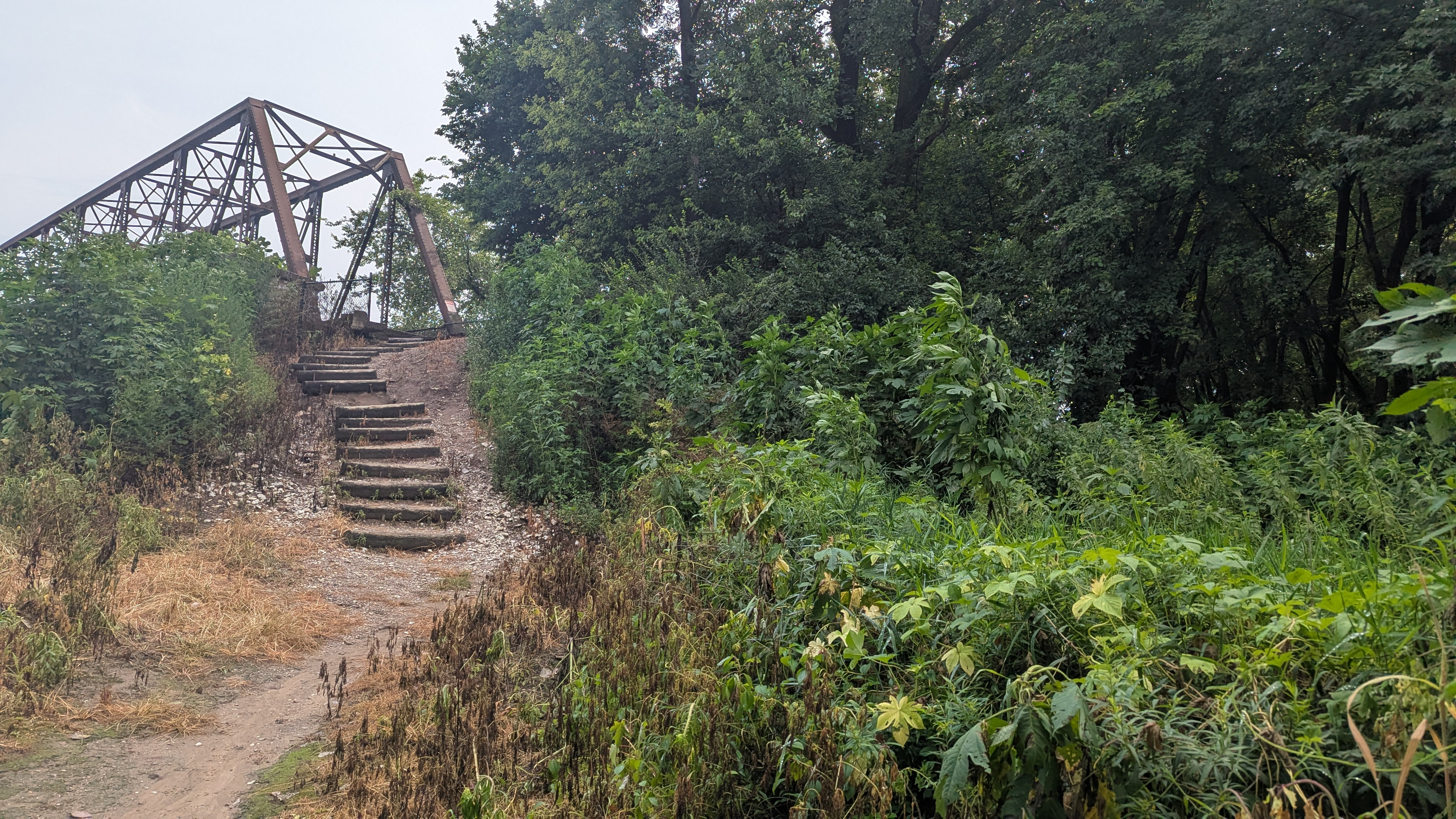
Wabash Heritage Trail

The Wabash Heritage Trail is a hiking trail running from Fort Ouiatenon to the Tippecanoe Battlefield Park in Battle Ground, Indiana. It is approximately 13 miles (21 km) long and passes along the cities of West Lafayette and Lafayette, Indiana.

The path consists of approximately 5 1/2 miles of paved path and 7.5 miles of unpaved footpath. Bicycles are permitted on paved portions of the trail. Horses and motorized vehicles are not allowed on any portion of the trail.
