= Green Meadows =

Green Meadows may refer to:

== United States ==
- Green Meadows, Los Angeles, a neighborhood in California
- Green Meadows, Indiana, an unincorporated community in Tippecanoe County
- Green Meadows, Prince George's County, Maryland, an unincorporated community
- Green Meadows, Ohio, a census-designated place
- Green Meadows, Oregon, a census-designated place

== Other uses ==
- Green Meadows, a fictional town in early drafts of Rachel Carson's Silent Spring, an American rural idyll turning dystopian, a town without birdsong
