= Tippecanoe Battlefield Park =

Park in Indiana, United States

- Tippecanoe Battlefield
- U.S. National Register of Historic Places
- U.S. National Historic Landmark
- U.S. Historic district – Contributing property
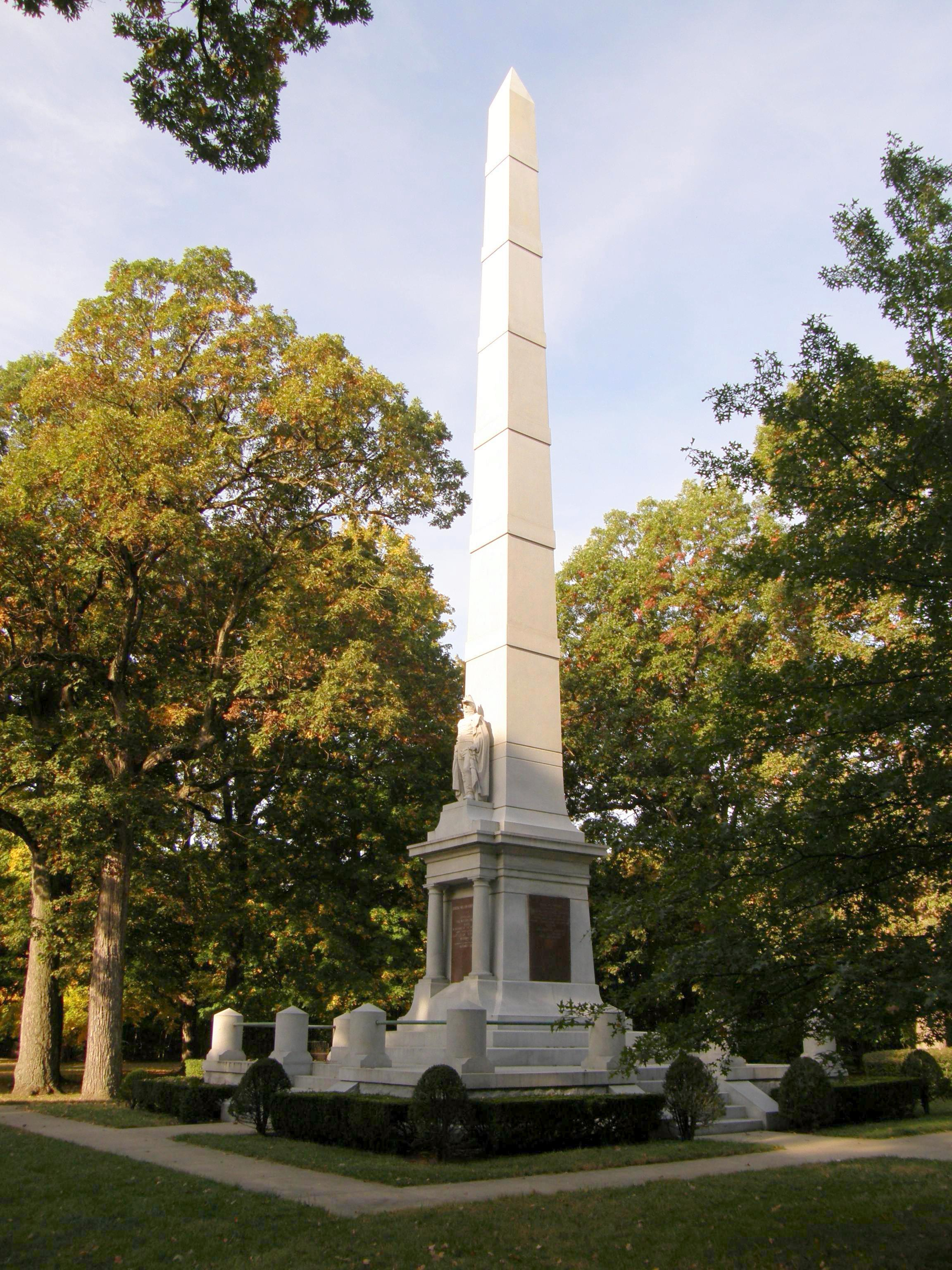
- Tippecanoe Monument

- Location within Tippecanoe County, Indiana Location within Indiana Location within the United States
- Nearest city: Lafayette, Indiana
- Coordinates: 40°30′21.8″N 86°50′40.8″W
- Built: 1811
- Part of: Battle Ground Historic District (ID85001639)
- NRHP reference No.: 66000013

Significant dates
- Added to NRHP: October 15, 1966
- Designated NHL: October 9, 1960
- Designated CP: July 23, 1985

The Tippecanoe Battlefield Park preserves the location of the Battle of Tippecanoe fought on November 7, 1811.

The 16-acre (6.5 ha) site of the battle was deeded to the State of Indiana by John Tipton, a veteran of the fight, on November 7, 1836, the twenty-fifth anniversary of the battle. The site was used for a number of major political rallies during its earlier years, those most significant being on May 29, 1840, in favor of William Henry Harrison's bid for the White House attended by 30,000 people.

The location was attracting visitors by the 1850s, and the battlefield was bordered by the Louisville, New Albany, & Salem Railroad during that decade. A refreshment stand was built adjacent to the site to accommodate visitors, and this land was later purchased by the Northwest Indiana Conference of the Methodist Church and used for the Battle Ground Collegiate Institute and later for a Methodist youth camp. Despite interest in the location for the sesquicentennial of the battle in 1961, the camp was abandoned in 1971 and the location was neglected. It was designated a National Historical Landmark in 1960. It is located in the Battle Ground Historic District.

Local residents acquired the Methodist property upon its closure, and created a museum in the camp's lodge. The citizen's group merged with the Tippecanoe County Historical Association in 1990 which took over operation of the museum. The museum was extensively renovated in 1995.

The Battlefield Monument was ceded to the Tippecanoe County Park Board in 1972.

== Recreational opportunities ==
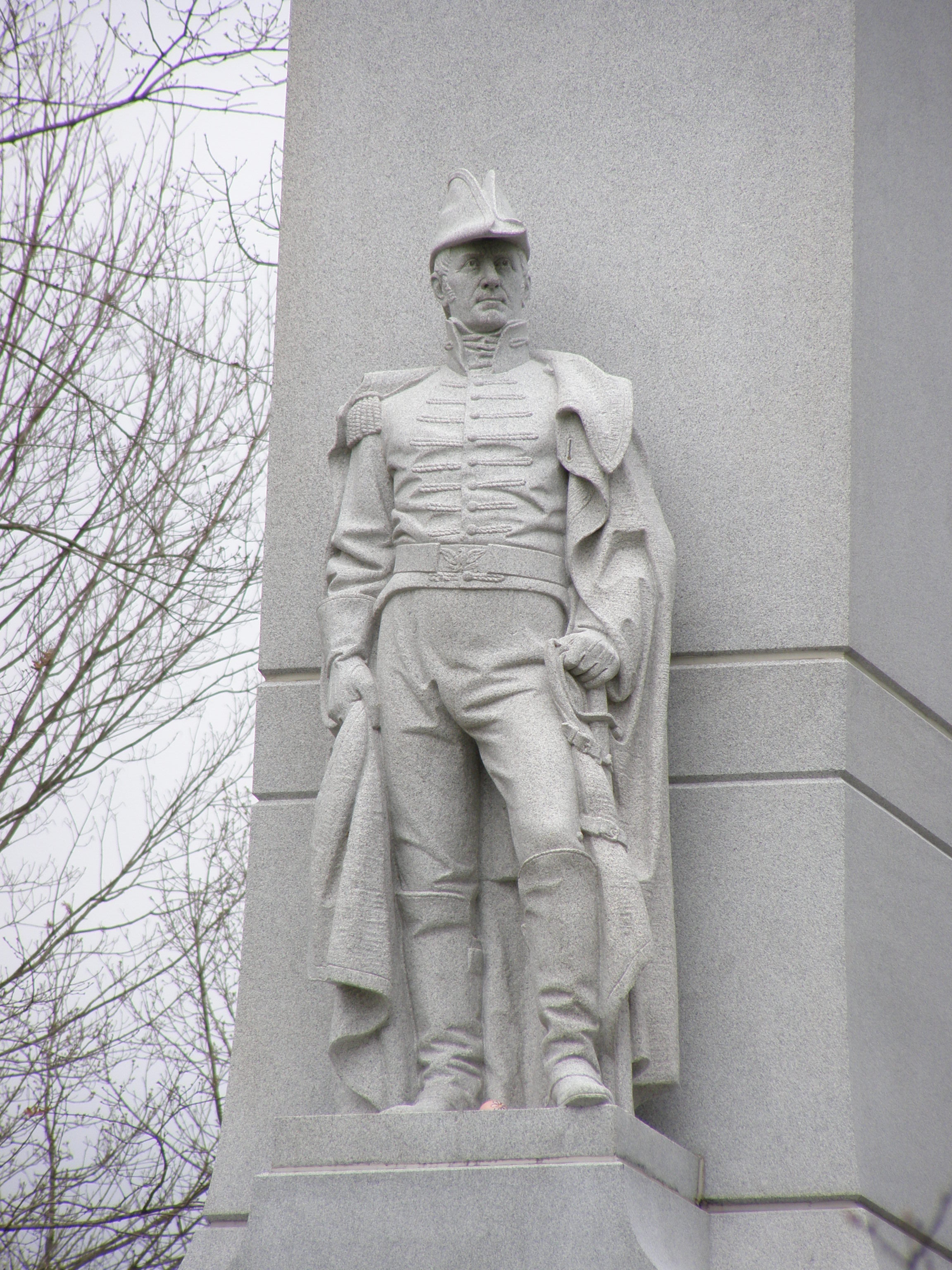
William Henry Harrison sculpture by John H. Mahoney

- Hiking (including access to the Wabash Heritage Trail).
- Nature Center
- Battlefield Monument
- Museum

Tippecanoe Battlefield Park is operated by the Tippecanoe County Park Board and the Battlefield Museum is operated by the Tippecanoe County Historical Association.

== See also ==
- Battle Ground, Indiana
- John Purdue
- Battle of Tippecanoe Outdoor Drama
- List of National Historic Landmarks in Indiana
- National Register of Historic Places listings in Tippecanoe County, Indiana
