= Octagon, Indiana =

- Unincorporated community
- Tippecanoe County's location in Indiana

- Location in Tippecanoe County
- Coordinates: 40°31′35″N 86°59′32″W
- Country: United States
- State: Indiana
- County: Tippecanoe
- Township: Wabash
- Elevation: 755 ft (230 m)
- Time zone: UTC-5 (Eastern (EST))
  - Summer (DST): UTC-4 (EDT)
- ZIP code: 47906
- Area code: 765
- GNIS feature ID: 440499

Octagon is a former unincorporated rural settlement in Wabash Township, Tippecanoe County, in the U.S. state of Indiana. As part of Tippecanoe County, the community is part of the Lafayette, Indiana Metropolitan Statistical Area.

== Geography ==
Octagon lies at the junction of local roads 750N and 450W, both gravel roads. It is 15 miles (24 km) from La Fayette, Indiana, the county seat.

== History ==
A post office was established at Octagon in 1866, and remained in operation until it was discontinued in 1900. Mail was subsequently routed through Lafayette.

Octagon was the site of a Masonic Lodge established in 1874, as well as several churches and schools over the years. The site apparently took its name from an octagon-shaped schoolhouse on the site at one time.

Octagon's population was 488 in 1900.

The original Octagon Schoolhouse, also known as Number 2, was named for the shape of the building, which was sometimes described as round. It was razed around 1872. The second Octagon School was an eight-sided building constructed in 1914, at a cost of $2,900. The Indiana State Superintendent called the eight-sided, one-room open design an "ideal plan" for a school. The stucco building was heated with coal, and there were no indoor restrooms.

Octagon's population was listed as 5 in 1940.

By 1975, Octagon had only "a few houses" and the Masonic temple, and was described as a "ghost town". The Masonic lodge had 107 members in 1954, and was still active at least as recently as 2002.

== See also ==
- Cairo, Indiana
