= Richard K. Thomas =

- Born: Richard Kenneth Thomas; June 27, 1953 (age 73)
- Education: Michigan State University (BA) Purdue University (MFA)
- Occupations: Professor, Sound Designer, Composer
- Employer: Purdue University College of Liberal Arts
- Website: www.zoundsproductions.com

Richard Kenneth Thomas (aka Zounds, Zounds Productions) is an early practitioner/advocate for theatre sound and composition for live theatre. He began his career at his recording studio, Zounds Productions, which he founded and co-owned with Brad Garton in the late 1970s and early 1980s. Zounds Productions produced among many other bands, legendary punk band Dow Jones and the Industrials.

He advocated for sound and composition as full members of the theatre creative team through his long relationship with the United States Institute for Theatre Technology, for which he was made a Fellow and Awarded the Joel E. Rubin Founder's Award in 2008, and awarded the Distinguished Achievement Award for Sound Design.

He published many early articles on theatre sound design and composition in the Theatre Design and Technology Journal dating back to 1988. He has published two books, one a biography of legendary Broadway Sound Designer Abe Jacob, The Designs of Abe Jacob,and Music as a Chariot, for Routledge, a philosophical treatise on theatre as a type of music, specifically, music to which ideas have been attached and conveyed through mimesis.

He has explored his theories on theatre as a type of music in a series of original productions that include Choices which was performed at World Stage Design in Taipei, Taiwan, and included as part of the US National Exhibition at the 2015 Prague Quadrennial, Ad Infinitum³, which performed at the 2011 Prague Quadrennial, and subsequently at the 2013 opening of the Qualcom Institute at the University of California, San Diego, and Labcoats on Clouds, which performed at the 2007 Prague Quadrennial.

His explorations in theatre as a type of music evolved largely out of the dozens of productions for which he composed sound scores over his nearly forty-year career as professional composer and sound designer. Thomas is a full professor of Visual and Performing Arts at Purdue University, where he has been honored many times including winning the 2017-2018 Purdue Liberal Arts Discovery Excellence Award for Creative Art, being named a Purdue Legacy Artist in 2010, and awarded The George P. Murphy Award for Outstanding Teaching in 2008.

== See also ==
Battle of Tippecanoe Outdoor Drama
