= Battle of Tippecanoe Outdoor Drama =

Outdoor play performed in Indiana, United States

The Battle of Tippecanoe Outdoor Drama (BOTOD) was an outdoor historical drama held near the site of the Battle of Tippecanoe in Battle Ground, Indiana, in the summers of 1989 and 1990. The drama was held at an amphitheater specially constructed for the production and funded by county authorization of an occupancy tax.

Unable to attract sufficient audiences, the drama board voted in the spring of 1991 to close the production. The county renamed the facility as the Tippecanoe County Amphitheater. The amphitheater is located just north of West Lafayette, Indiana on 166 acres on State Route 43 near the Wabash River, within walking distance of the Tippecanoe Battlefield Park.

== Creation ==
The drama was written by Dr. Dale E. Miller, Purdue University Theatre Faculty Emeritus, and Dr. Sam Smiley, a Columbus, Indiana, native and feature film writer. Smiley had been head of Dramatic Writing at the University of Arizona. Miller toured outdoor theatres across the country in 1982 as he began to work on his conception of the drama. His program bio says that he began working on the drama in 1979. Miller also served as Artistic Director for the two years of summer productions.

== Sound design ==
Purdue professor Richard K. Thomas composed the sound design, creating an 8-channel surround audio using a Yamaha Rev 7 to master the mix. Thomas' participation was supported by the Indiana Arts Commission and the National Endowment for the Arts.

Carrie Newcomer, an Indiana folk music composer, wrote "Sounds of the Morning" for the production, played as a prologue and as patrons left the amphitheater. Her CD Visions and Dreams (1995) included this song.

== Other artistic credits ==
Purdue professor Carol Cunningham-Sigman designed dance choreography, Kent Shelton did the fight and stunt choreography, Stan Abbott created scenery, and Julie Mack created lighting for the production. Changes in the second season included more special effects.

== Summary ==
Dorothy Schneider described the battle in a 2011 Lafayette Journal and Courier article about a re-enactment: "The fight took place near the confluence of the Tippecanoe and Wabash rivers northeast of Lafayette. Thirty-seven American soldiers and an unknown number of Native Americans died in the battle."

Historic figures portrayed in the drama included General and Governor William Henry Harrison, The Prophet, Tecumseh, Harrison's family, townspeople, scouts, Indiana Militia and Dragoons, Kentucky Militia and Dragoons, United States Infantry, both Pro and anti-American Indians, and British troops.

== Box office ==
The Lafayette Rotary Archives of 1983–84, described their work to complete the box office structure: "Interested members formed a Battle of Tippecanoe Outdoor Drama Project Committee... The first project was to raise $40,000 for the box office structure, which was accomplished in a fund drive that lasted from December until April."

According to the Pharos-Tribune of Logansport, Indiana, tickets were $12 for adults and $6 for children. The Battle was presented Tuesday through Sunday both summers.

== Tippecanoe County Amphitheater ==
The Lafayette Journal and Courier reported on planning for the amphitheater. "In 1986, the Tippecanoe County Parks board made plans and obtained $3 million in finances to build an amphitheater for performances of the 'Battle of Tippecanoe Outdoor Drama'."

The amphitheater seated 1511 people and includes concession stands, gift shop and restroom facilities under a rain shelter behind the seating area.

== Controversy regarding dramatization ==
In 1989 when the play was first produced, local Native Americans objected to the stereotypical characterization of their ancestors and their roles in this battle. A Native American woman elder walked onstage at the opening night curtain call to question the truthfulness of the portrayals of Native Americans.

The 1990 program reported on the production company adding a clan mother of the Shawnee as a consultant and making changes to the drama to improve its portrayal of Native Americans.

"Certain artistic liberties have been taken for the sake of providing dramatic impact and in an honest effort to condense a historic period of five years into a two-hour presentation. It is the sincere wish of the authors and producers that we can be historically accurate and authentic in re-enacting this important piece of American history as dramatic and theatrical guidelines will allow. We are honored to add Nita Bruce, Hawk Clan Mother, Upper Kispoko Band, Shawnee Nation of Indiana, and a descendant of Pocahontas, as a consultant to (the drama). Revisions in the script for the drama were made this year following meetings with representatives of the Upper Kispoko Band, Shawnee Nation of Indiana. The changes involve an honest attempt to eliminate stereotypical portrayal of Native Americans."

== Closing ==
Attendance at the amphitheater did not meet expectations, and an infusion of tax money by the county could not sustain the expensive project. "$178,000 in unused innkeeper tax funds (were used) to bail out the financially ailing Battle of Tippecanoe Outdoor Drama, and allow it to perform in 1990."

Following the second season, in the spring of 1991, the drama board voted to dissolve the production. The county converted the amphitheater to use for other community events, such as concerts.

The authors of Creating Historical Drama: A Guide for Communities, Theatre Groups, and Playwrights (2005) interviewed Dale Miller as they studied the experience in Lafayette. They also drew from studying other outdoor dramas and wrote:

"When a cooperative community effort has been lacking, historical drama frequently fails. In the summer of 1989, near Lafayette, Indiana, the outdoor historical drama The Battle of Tippecanoe opens, but almost immediately there is a public controversy over the historical accuracy of the script. Local critics object to what they say is sufficient manipulation of history that the play ought to be labeled fiction. Author Dale Miller responds that the drama is 'a selective look at history,' but the objections grew, the public is cautious, and the drama struggles to find an audience until, in 1991, it closes after having played to only 19 percent capacity that summer. To make matters worse, the county of Tippecanoe built the $3 million theatre used for the production with a 3 percent local hotel-occupancy tax. The Wall Street Journal reports on March 14, 1991 that 'hotel guests will be paying off the bonds for the theatre until 1999.' Public sentiment for this play is at first strong, but it fails by opening night. It dooms the entire operation."

In 2006, nearby Cass County's Chief Logan's Port of Living History Festival at France Park was reported as struggling in its second year. Sufficient changes must have been made, as the Cass County festival was still operating in 2011.
