= Indiana State Soldiers Home Historic District =

Historic district in Indiana, United States

- U.S. National Register of Historic Places
- U.S. Historic district
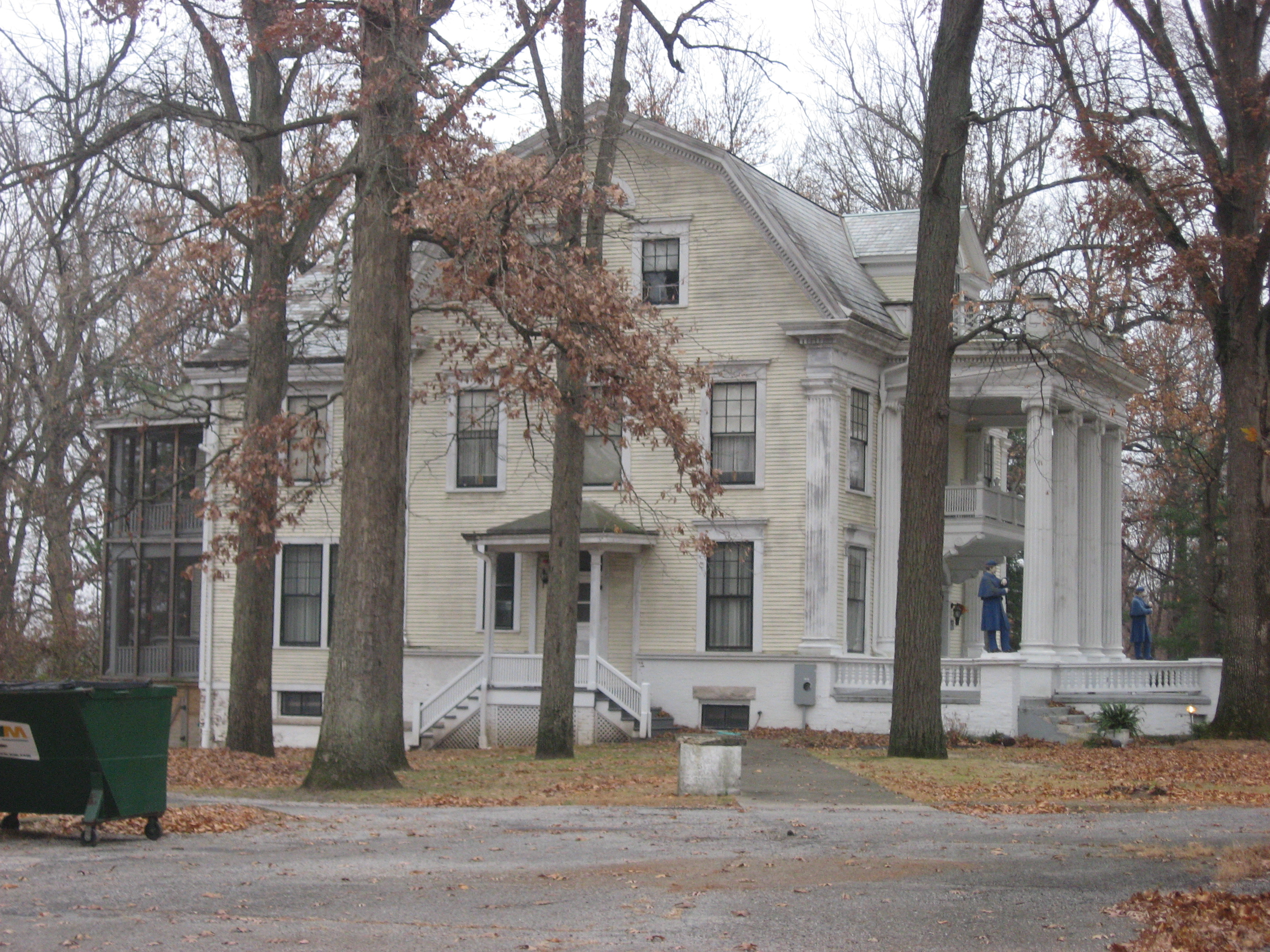
- Indiana State Soldiers Home house, November 2010

- Location within Tippecanoe County, Indiana Location within Indiana Location within the United States
- Location: North of Lafayette off State Road 43, Tippecanoe Township and Wabash Township, Tippecanoe County, Indiana
- Coordinates: 40°28′8″N 86°53′15″W
- Area: 9 acres (3.6 ha)
- Built: 1895
- NRHP reference No.: 74000034
- Added to NRHP: January 2, 1974

Indiana State Soldiers Home Historic District is a historic Soldiers Home and national historic district located in Tippecanoe Township and Wabash Township, Tippecanoe County, Indiana. The district encompasses four contributing buildings on the campus of the former Soldiers Home. They are the Post Exchange, Commandant's House, Library Building (formerly the Commissary), and the Administration Building. Funding for the home was approved by the Indiana State Legislature in 1888, and building commenced in 1890. Most of the original buildings were demolished in the 1950s. The property continued to be administered by the Indiana Department of Veterans' Affairs as the Indiana Veterans’ Home.

It was listed on the National Register of Historic Places in 1974.
