= Purduettes =

Purdue University choir

The Purduettes are the primary treble choral ensemble of Purdue University. Formed in 1942, the group typically consists of 50-60 undergraduate collegiate women and performs a variety of jazz, gospel, and swing songs. Similar to the all-male Purdue Varsity Glee Club, the Purduettes are housed within Purdue Musical Organizations, wear matching attire, employ student leadership, and feature smaller groups of members known as Specialites that perform during shows. The group is a featured ensemble annually in the Purdue Christmas Show, and in 2022 the Purduettes celebrated their 80th anniversary. Roughly every 4–5 years the Purduettes tour internationally, most recently to Costa Rica in 2015, and were planning to travel to Italy in spring 2020.

== History ==
Formed in 1942 during the Second World War, the original group of 13 women were chosen by Al Stewart to fulfill the performance schedule of the Purdue Varsity Glee Club when its schedule was curtailed due to the members leaving for service in the war.

Al Stewart took the Purduettes on a tour of the East coast that included a performance at the Eastman Kodak Company in Rochester, New York. The Purduettes were a hit and began entertaining audiences nationwide. Stewart originally designed four costumes for the Purduettes including a simple black and white choir gown and the well-known white satin, off-the-shoulder formal gown.

Although Stewart restored the men's Glee Club as soon as the war was over, the Purduettes had made their mark in history, and the women added a new flare to Purdue Musical Organizations. Even today, the Purduettes remain the choice group for many audiences.

== Specialty groups ==
Purduette Trio
This group takes inspiration from the stylings of the Andrews and McGuire sisters as well as the big band and swing sounds of the '40s and '50s.

The Remedy
The Remedy sings a variety of sacred and secular Americana music.

Lonely Hearts
This group sings a wide variety of music, from girl groups of the 1960s to movie tunes to contemporary pop, jazz and Latin hits. While performing the songs of Etta James to Sara Bareilles to Imelda May, the Lonely Hearts maintain a style, groove and sense of moxie that audiences love.
