= UK Wolf Conservation Trust =

Conservation non-profit based in Berkshire, England

- Founded: May 1995
- Founder: Roger Palmer
- Type: Non-profit
- Purpose: Conservation
- Location: Beenham, England
- Region served: Europe
- Method: Education, supporting conservation projects
- Website: ukwct.org.uk

The UK Wolf Conservation Trust is a non-profit organisation based in Berkshire, England. The organisation aims are to dispel what they regard as myths and misconceptions surrounding wolves, and to support wolves living in the wild elsewhere in Europe. The organisation is currently home to five wolves: Nuka, Tala, and Tundra.

== History ==
Businessman Roger Palmer visited Alaska in the 1970s where he encountered wolves for the first time. Upon his return to the UK he decided to acquire a wolf. Palmer kept wolves into the mid 1990s and, encouraged by ethologist Erich Klinghammer, founded the UK Wolf Conservation Trust (UKWCT) in 1995.

== Activities ==
The UKWCT has 5 ambassador wolves, all of which are socialised wolves split into two packs. The wolves are taken for walks most weekends in the open farmland around the Trust, accompanied by members of the public and UKWCT. The idea is to allow people to see wolves in a different light to the experience seen at most zoos, which generally don't socialise their animals.

Education is a major part of the UKWCT's ethos and they hold regular seminars, with biologists and other speakers giving talks about wolves and current conservation work. The UKWCT's magazine, WolfPrint, attracts contributions from those involved with wolf conservation and reports on current events in the wolf world.

== Achievements ==
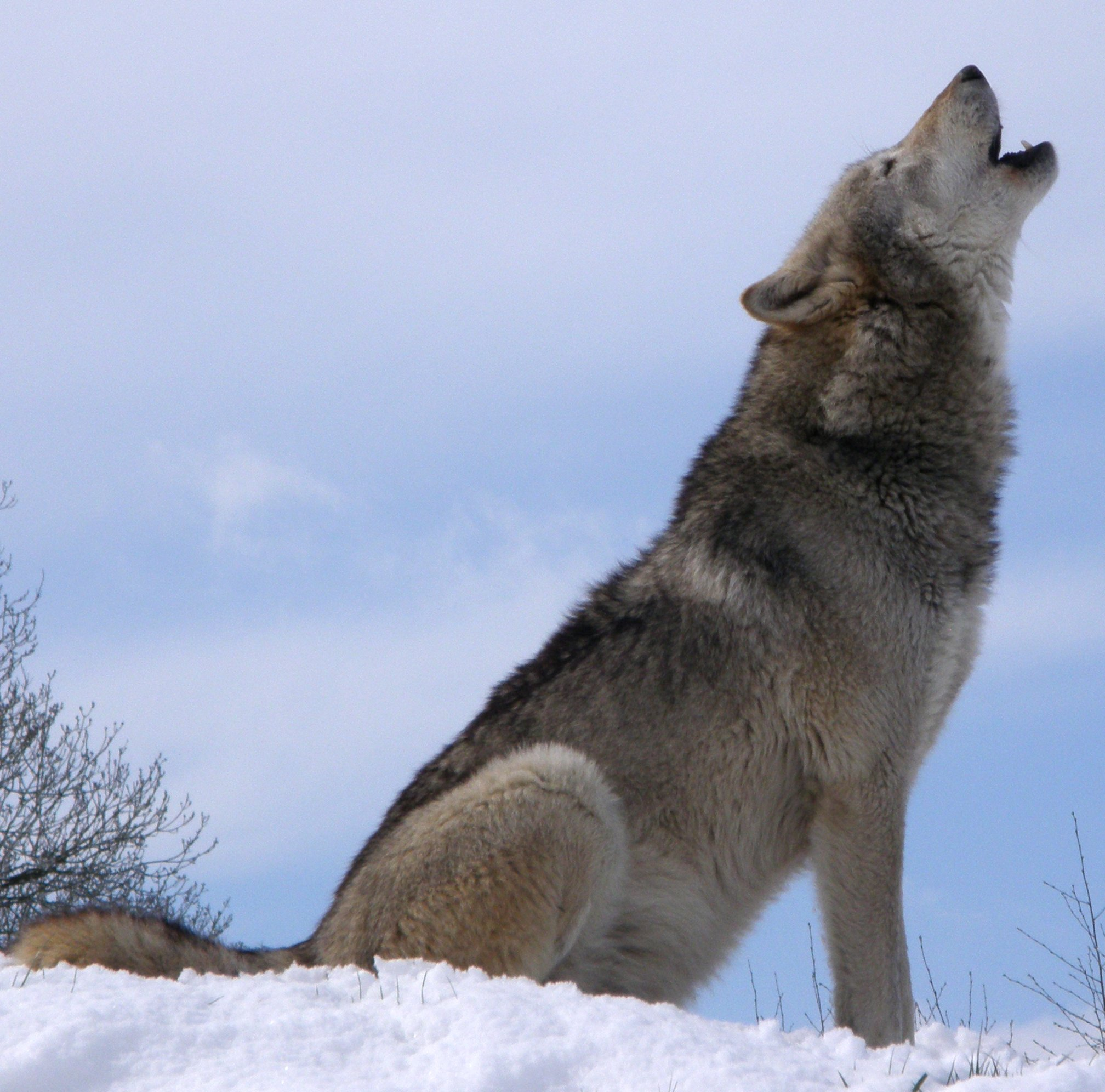
Dakota, a grey wolf at the UK Wolf Conservation Trust, howling on top of a snowy hill.

In 1998, the UKWCT imported three European wolves from eastern Europe and in 1999 they gave birth to six pups. This was reported to be the first birth of European wolves in the UK since they were driven to extinction in the 18th century. After their relocation to Wildwood in Kent, the imported wolves had several further litters.

The UKWCT look after the UK's first Arctic wolves - Massak, Pukak and Sikko. They were imported from Quebec in Canada in March 2011 when a snowstorm destroyed their mother's den, causing her to reject the newborn cubs. The UKWCT were then invited to take these cubs back to the UK, where they have lived ever since.

Projects supported by the UKWCT include helping to buy livestock guardian dogs for Bulgarian shepherds, as well as supporting wolf research and education in the Tver region of Russia and also in Croatia. Support has also been provided for the Ethiopian wolf, for other European projects, and for the red and Mexican wolves in the Americas. To date, the Trust has donated over £150,000 to wolf conservation projects worldwide.
