= Purdue Varsity Glee Club =

The Purdue Varsity Glee Club is one of the principal vocal groups of Purdue University. It sings a wide variety of music comprising novelty, patriotic, classical, inspirational, jazz, pop, and barbershop genres. The group currently consists of roughly 60-70 tenors and basses, includes a live accompanying band, and is one of six ensembles associated with Purdue Musical Organizations.

== History ==
The Purdue Varsity Glee Club was founded in 1893 with 11 members, under the direction of Lafayette organist Cyrus Dadswell. At the time, Purdue University was an agricultural and engineering school without a strong musical tradition. In 1910, under the direction of Edward J. Wotawa, the Glee Club composed the fight song “Hail Purdue!”, originally titled "Purdue War Song". During the 1920s and 1930s, directors Paul Smith and Albert Stewart led and expanded the organization.

Al Stewart was refused funding by the university president, thus early funding came from Indianapolis pharmaceutical magnate, Josiah K. Lilly Sr. Lacking regular rehearsal space, the organization was considered a campus orphan. Lillian Stewart, wife of then comptroller R. B. Stewart, offered her living room as rehearsal space. However, as the Glee Club gathered more admirers, University President Edward C. Elliot yielded and formalized Al Stewart's position, hired a staff, and provided rehearsal space.

The first official space for the Glee Club was in the “Music Penthouse,” the top floor of University Hall, but eventually dedicated rehearsal, office and equipment space was provided over 5 floors in the southwest corner of the newly built Purdue Hall of Music. After decades in the Hall of Music, Ralph and Bettye Bailey Hall was built at the corner of Grant Street and Northwestern Avenue specifically for Purdue Musical Organizations, whose ensembles moved there in 2014. Funding to construct the building came primarily from private donations. In the fall of 2018, the Purdue Varsity Glee Club celebrated its 125th anniversary.

== Traditions ==
Tradition is considered a major aspect of the Purdue Varsity Glee Club. Members are required keep their hair short and their faces clean-shaven. The standard attire for most performances is a traditional white tie full dress tuxedo. Alternatively, blue sports coats and gold ties are occasionally worn, usually only featured at certain occasions. During casual events, the group wears matching "travel attire" consisting of jeans, white sneakers, a Purdue Varsity Glee Club polo, and a track jacket. As of 2024, the Glee Club polo was changed to a Purdue Musical Organizations T-shirt for consistency across ensembles. Members must also maintain credible academic grades and have "excellence in character." Additional traditions are listed as follows:

=== The Purdusirs and Purdusires ===
The Purdusirs are a leadership group composed of junior and senior members. Each "sir" leads a committee. These committees change frequently, but typically include Advancement, Public Relations, Properties, Rehearsal Room Lounge & Transportation, Scholarship, Recruitment, Merchandise, Social Media, and Performance Preparation. Additionally, a manager and an assistant manager oversee the entire glee club. Each sir is identified by gold and black ribbons worn across the chest of their full dress.

The Purdusires are a parallel organization composed of administration, faculty, and staff members. Each "sire" is individually assigned to a committee and acts as an advisor to the committee which they are assigned.

=== Mingling ===
Members of the Glee Club spend a short time mingling with audience members after performances. This provides an opportunity for the singers to show their appreciation as well as to connect with interested individuals, and hear one final song before saying goodnight.

=== The Carnation ===
White carnation boutonnières are traditionally worn by the Glee Club members as part of their full dress attire. After a performance, traditionally, each member pins his carnation on the woman of his choice.

=== The Medallion ===
The medallions worn by the Glee Club were originally provided by the National Multiple Sclerosis Society in recognition of the club's charity work. In 1990, the NMSS discontinued the production of these medallions. In the fall of 1991, however, the Glee Club acquired new medallions featuring the Purdue seal on the front and Glee Club Pete on the back to commemorate the group's upcoming centennial (1893–1993). The Purdue seal has two prominent features. The griffin symbolizes strength in medieval heraldry. The three part shield represents education, research, and service.

=== The Lavalier ===
During their final season with the Glee Club, graduating members have the opportunity to honor two important people in their lives by presenting them with a lavalier.

=== Glee Club Pete ===
Glee Club Pete is the traditional mascot of the Purdue Varsity Glee Club. It is a variation of the university's official mascot, Purdue Pete, and wears a top hat and a full dress uniform similar to that worn by the Glee Club members.

The character originated as a joke in 1954, when Al Stewart and the Glee Club performed for the Rotary Club of North Manchester, Indiana. One of the men of the Rotary Club by the name of Slim Warren took the traditional Purdue Pete and made a few modifications. Slim fashioned a 4-foot replica of Pete dressed in the complete Glee Club full-dress outfit and positioned him at the side of the stage. Stewart and the Glee Club took up a liking with the modified Purdue Pete so much that they adopted him as their official mascot.

=== World Travels ===
The Purdue Varsity Glee Club has traveled throughout the continental United States and internationally to various countries in Europe, China, the South Pacific, South Africa, Australia, and New Zealand. In May 2017, The Glee Club embarked on a tour of Poland and the Baltic states (Estonia, Latvia and Lithuania). In May 2019, the group traveled on a two-week tour of Scotland and the United Kingdom with the Purdue Bells. In Europe, the Glee Club performed at many venues such as the Lincoln Cathedral in Lincolnshire, England, and Fernhill & Cathkin Church in Fernhill, South Lanarkshire.

Their most recent trip in May 2024 saw them embarking on a two-week trip down under to the countries of Australia and New Zealand. There, the Glee Club performed in a variety of concert venues including Verbruggen Hall in the Sydney Conservatory of Music in Sydney, Australia, and St. Matthew-in-the-City Anglican Cathedral in downtown Auckland, New Zealand. As ambassadors, the Glee Club shares and represents the university's name and image all over the world.

=== Purdue Christmas Show ===
The Purdue Varsity Glee Club performs in the Purdue Christmas Show, a seasonal performance held at the Edward C. Elliott Hall of Music.

The first Christmas Show was held in 1933 in Fowler Hall. The show typically includes multiple performances of the Purdue Christmas show each year over the first weekend in December. The Christmas show is made up of performances by the Varsity Glee Club, the Purduettes, the Purdue Bells, University Choir, Heart & Soul, PMO Kids Choir and the All Campus and Community Chorale.

Construction on the sets for the Christmas show begins in the summer. It takes three months to build the set, and two weeks to put it on stage and fine tune the songs. Hundreds of gallons of paint and nearly 1,000 yards of fabric are used to create the sets, props, floor drop, screens, and the custom curtain.

== Directors of the Purdue Varsity Glee Club ==
- Cyrus Dadswell (1893) – Organist, first director of The Purdue Varsity Glee Club
- The glee club went through five directors in the first five years.
- E.J. Wotawa (1910) – A former student who took over directing
- Paul & Helen Smith (1920–1927)
- Al Stewart (1932–1974) – First full-time director, founded Purdue Musical Organizations, acquired costumes, staff, and rehearsal space.
- Bill Luhman (1974–1982) – PMO's Purdue Bells started under his direction
- William "Bill" Allen (1982–1989) – Full-time arranger and accompanist for the Glee Club, credited with many of Glee Club's fan favorites. Founded Ba-Na-Na and Poison Oaks specialty groups.
- Brian Breed (1989–2007) – Conducted many tours and saw growth in supporters and fans from far and near.
- Gerritt J. Vandermeer (January–May 2008) – Interim Glee Club alumnus who led the group on its international trip to South Africa.
- William E. Griffel (June 2008–present)
