= Wabash Township, Tippecanoe County, Indiana =

Wabash Township
- Township
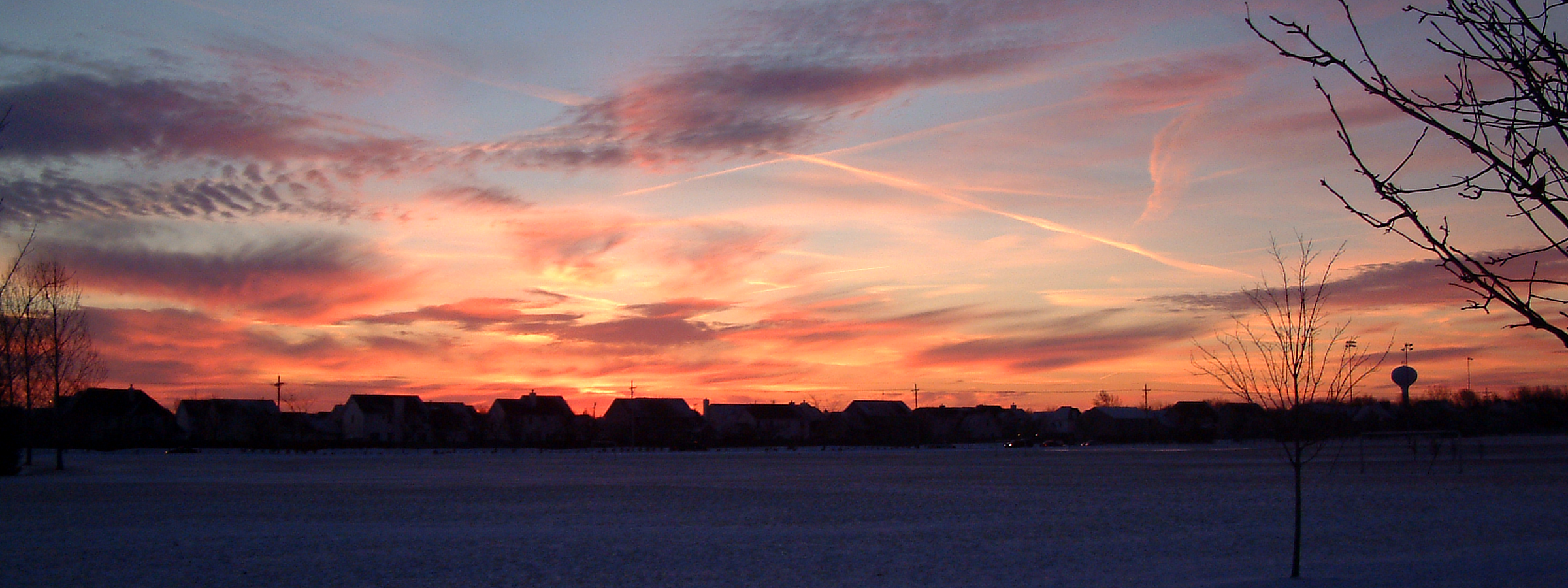
- Dawn skies over a West Lafayette neighborhood

- Location in Tippecanoe County
- Coordinates: 40°28′20″N 86°57′15″W
- Country: United States
- State: Indiana
- County: Tippecanoe

Government
  - Type: Indiana township
  - Trustee: Angel Valentine
  - Board Secretary: Brendan Betz
  - Board Member: David Tate

Area
  - Total: 49.1 sq mi (127 km^{2})
  - Land: 48.65 sq mi (126.0 km^{2})
  - Water: 0.46 sq mi (1.2 km^{2}) 0.94%
- Elevation: 659 ft (201 m)

Population (2020)
  - Total: 64,157
  - Density: 1,218.5/sq mi (470.5/km^{2})
- Time zone: UTC-5 (Eastern (EST))
  - Summer (DST): UTC-4 (EDT)
- ZIP codes: 47906
- Area code: 765
- GNIS feature ID: 453967
- Website: wabashtownship79.in.gov

Wabash Township is one of thirteen townships in Tippecanoe County, Indiana, United States. As of the 2010 census, its population was 59,279 and it contained 21,448 housing units making it the most populous township in Tippecanoe County.

== Geography ==
According to the 2010 census, the township has a total area of 49.1 square miles (127 km^{2}), of which 48.65 square miles (126.0 km^{2}) (or 99.08%) is land and 0.46 square miles (1.2 km^{2}) (or 0.94%) is water. Wabash Township encompasses all but a small section of the City of West Lafayette and encompasses all of Purdue University making it one of the most culturally diverse townships in the United States.

Climate data for Wabash Township, Tippecanoe County, Indiana
Month	Jan	Feb	Mar	Apr	May	Jun	Jul	Aug	Sep	Oct	Nov	Dec	Year
Record high °F (°C)	69 (21)	73 (23)	86 (30)	89 (32)	94 (34)	105 (41)	105 (41)	100 (38)	98 (37)	92 (33)	78 (26)	73 (23)	105 (41)
Mean daily maximum °F (°C)	34 (1)	39 (4)	50 (10)	63 (17)	73 (23)	83 (28)	85 (29)	84 (29)	78 (26)	65 (18)	51 (11)	38 (3)	62 (17)
Mean daily minimum °F (°C)	19 (−7)	23 (−5)	31 (−1)	41 (5)	51 (11)	61 (16)	64 (18)	63 (17)	55 (13)	44 (7)	34 (1)	23 (−5)	42 (6)
Record low °F (°C)	−23 (−31)	−20 (−29)	−3 (−19)	7 (−14)	25 (−4)	35 (2)	43 (6)	37 (3)	29 (−2)	19 (−7)	6 (−14)	−16 (−27)	−23 (−31)
Average precipitation inches (mm)	1.86 (47)	1.84 (47)	2.67 (68)	3.54 (90)	4.19 (106)	4.10 (104)	3.97 (101)	3.46 (88)	2.66 (68)	2.89 (73)	2.97 (75)	2.51 (64)	36.66 (931)
Average snowfall inches (cm)	6.5 (17)	4.8 (12)	2.9 (7.4)	0.7 (1.8)	0 (0)	0 (0)	0 (0)	0 (0)	0 (0)	0.3 (0.76)	0.8 (2.0)	5.2 (13)	21.2 (54)
Average precipitation days (≥ 0.01 in)	9.6	7.7	10.2	10.9	10.6	10.4	8.9	8.4	7.6	8.3	9.8	10.1	112.5
Average snowy days (≥ 0.1 in)	5.3	3.3	1.7	0.3	0	0	0	0	0	0.1	0.9	3.5	15.1
Source 1: The Weather Channel (January record high)
Source 2: NOAA: Lafayette

=== Cities, towns, villages ===
- West Lafayette (vast majority)

=== Neighborhoods and former and unincorporated communities ===
- Bar Barry Heights at 40.4561460°N 86.9158439°W
- Green Meadows at 40.4397571°N 86.9658446°W
- Indian Village at 40.4664238°N 86.9008437°W
- Klondike at 40.4675345°N 86.9622340°W
- McQuinn Estates at 40.4375350°N 86.9589000°W
- Octagon at 40.5264233°N 86.9922358°W
- Ravinamy at 40.4619794°N 86.8977881°W
- Summit at 40.4167020°N 86.9291768°W
- Wabash Shores at 40.4492018°N 86.9108437°W

(This list is based on USGS data and may include former settlements.)

=== Adjacent townships ===
- Prairie Township, White County (northeast)
- Tippecanoe Township (northeast)
- Fairfield Township (southeast)
- Union Township (south)
- Wayne Township (southwest)
- Shelby Township (west)
- Round Grove Township, White County (northwest)

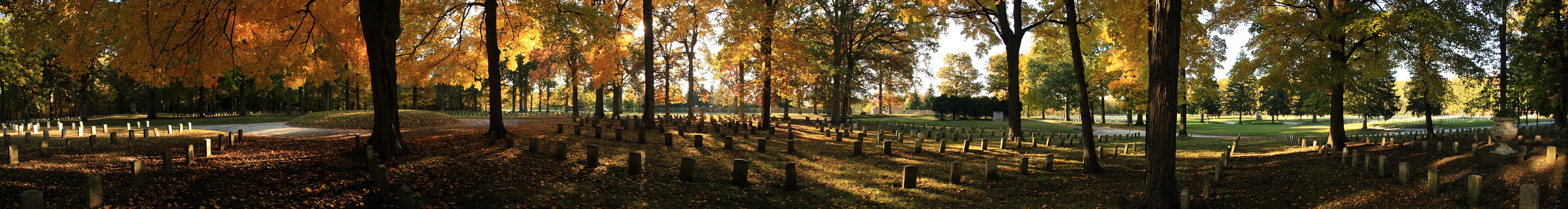
Indiana State Soldiers' Home Cemetery

=== Cemeteries ===
The township contains five cemeteries: Grandview, Hebron, Indiana State Soldiers' Home, Sand Ridge and Tippecanoe Memory Gardens.

=== Major highways ===
- US Route 52
- US Route 231
- Indiana State Road 43

=== Airports ===
- Purdue University Airport

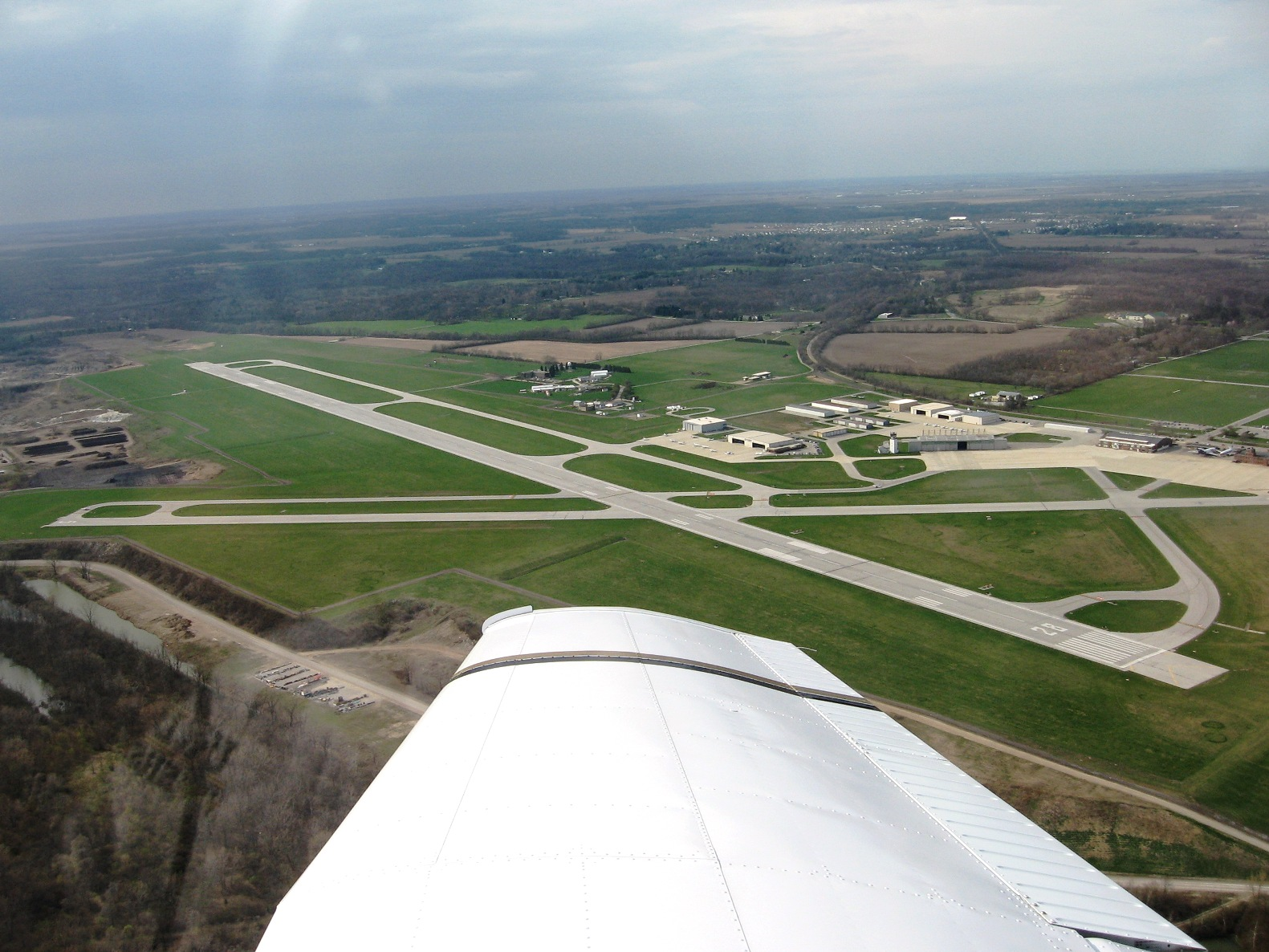
Purdue University Airport

=== Lakes ===
- Hadley Lake
- Celery Bog Nature Area

=== Landmarks ===
- Purdue University
- C-SPAN Archives
- Fort Ouiatenon A former French trading post built in the early 1700s.
- Samara House - Samara is a house designed by Frank Lloyd Wright.
- Indiana State Soldiers Home Historic District, Levi and Lucy Morehouse Farm, and James Pierce Jr. House are listed on the National Register of Historic Places.

=== News and Media ===
- WLFI-TV is a CBS affiliate owned by LIN Media.
- WBAA and WBAA-FM are radio stations owned by Metropolitan Indianapolis Public Media, with studios at Purdue University.
- Purdue Exponent is a daily independent student run newspaper.

== School districts ==
- Tippecanoe School Corporation
- West Lafayette Community School Corporation

== Political districts ==
- Indiana's 4th congressional district
- State House District 26
- State House District 27
- State Senate District 22

== Township Officials ==
=== Township Trustee ===
- Angel Valentin

=== Township Board ===
- Brendan Betz
- David Tate
- Vacant (pending Democratic caucus to fill position vacated by Angel Valentin)

=== Trustee Teising's Residency Violation and Criminal Conviction ===
Jennifer Teising, running as a Democrat, was elected to a four-year term as township Trustee in the 2018 general election. Almost immediately upon taking office, she replaced the existing fire chief. She then spearheaded an effort to take a series of emergency loans, funded by increased property taxes, in order to fund fire department improvements including the hiring of additional firefighters and the provision of benefits to paid fire department staff. Teising failed to gain public support for her plan to gain long-term funding for the fire department improvements, and instead, in a series of moves that were opposed by the township advisory board, fired the Fire Chief for alleged subordination and the township's three full-time firefighters due to lack of funding, leaving much of the emergency loan money unspent.

Public records showed that in early 2020, Teising sold her home and updated her voter registration to reflect a primary residency at an address elsewhere within the township. A investigative report by the local newspaper in December 2020 found that after the sale of her house, Teising had spent substantial time outside the township, and at the time of the investigation was living at an RV park in Florida.

On January 29, 2021, Indiana State Police served a search warrant on the Trustee's office, and Teising later revealed she was being investigated for violating the residency requirement of her elected office. On May 12, 2021, a grand jury indicted Teising on 20 felony counts of theft for continuing to draw paychecks without meeting the residency requirement of the position from June 17, 2020, through March 26, 2021. A grand jury later indicted Teising on an additional felony charge of theft for allegedly improperly continuing to draw a paycheck during the period of April through June 2021. She denied the allegations and revealed plans to sue Prosecutor Harrington for malicious prosecution. After motions by the defense that a special prosecutor be assigned and that the trial be moved outside the county were denied, Teising waived her right to jury trial, citing a lack of confidence in being able to seat an impartial jury in Tippecanoe County.

Trustee Teising's bench trial was held from Dec 13, 2021 to Dec 15, 2021 with Judge Kristen McVey presiding. The prosecution presented evidence that during the 10 months in question, Teising stayed overnight in the township just 27 nights, and that she had packages delivered, paid utilities, and signed a 6-month rental agreement at addresses outside the township. Multiple witnesses testified that in early 2020, Teising had revealed plans to leave office prior to the end of her elected term and move to Florida. The defense argued that although Teising traveled extensively outside the township, including extended stays in Florida, she maintained a legal residence in the township at the address of a former boyfriend. On January 5, 2022, Judge McVey convicted Teising on all 21 felony counts of theft, citing a failure by Teising to "make her true, permanent, and fixed home in Wabash Township" and her actions that "evince[d] a desire to conceal her actual whereabouts." As dictated by state law, the felony conviction resulted in the trustee's immediate removal from office. She was later sentenced to 124 days in jail, 124 days in community detention, and 2.5 years in probation, and was ordered to pay restitution for the illegal paychecks. The combined 248 days of detention corresponded to the 248 days she was ruled to have lived outside the township.
