= Tippecanoe Township, Tippecanoe County, Indiana =

Tippecanoe Township
- Township
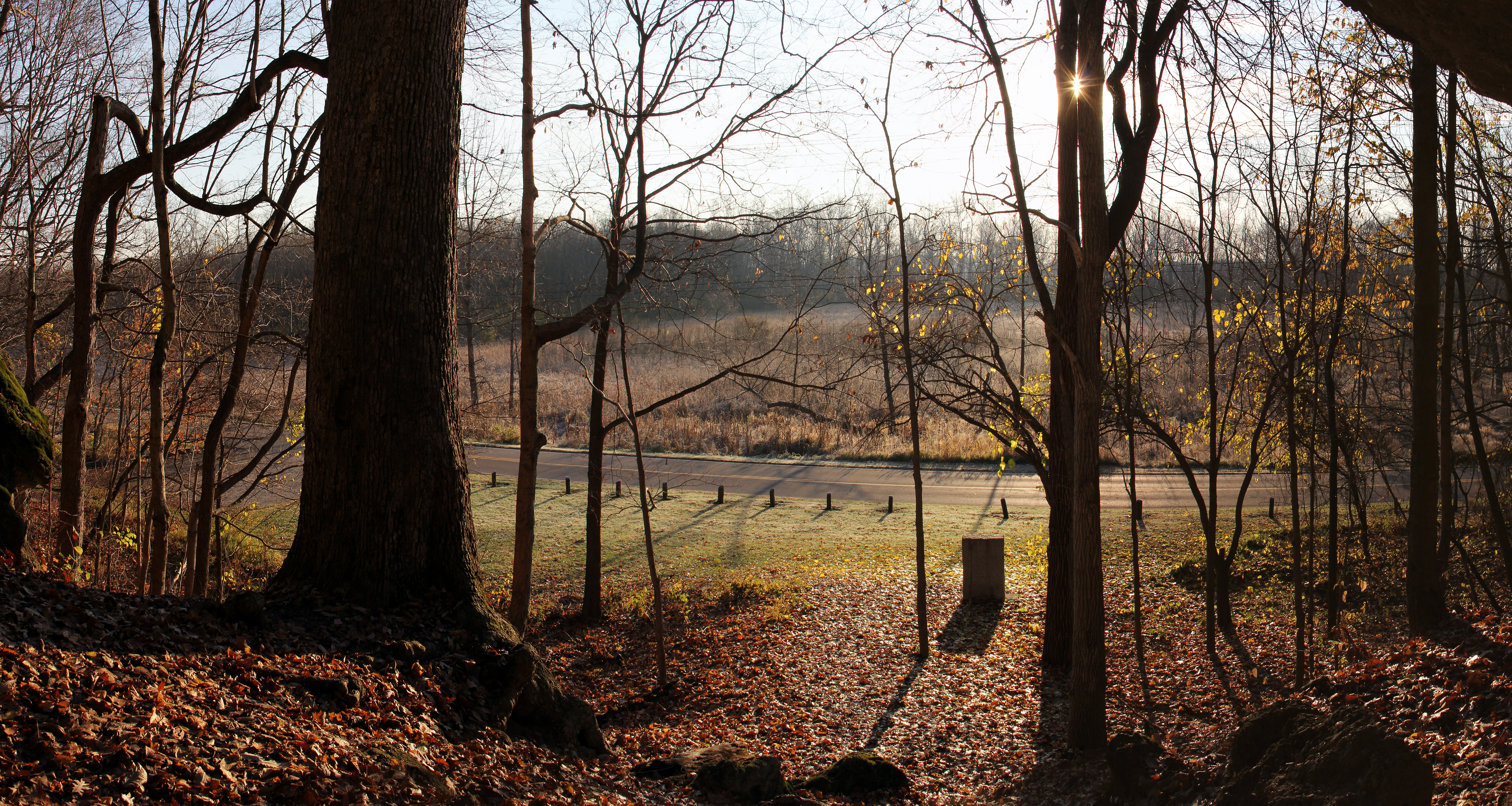
- The view from Prophet's Rock near Battle Ground

- Location in Tippecanoe County
- Coordinates: 40°31′33″N 86°50′55″W
- Country: United States
- State: Indiana
- County: Tippecanoe

Government
  - Type: Indiana township

Area
  - Total: 48.81 sq mi (126.4 km^{2})
  - Land: 48 sq mi (120 km^{2})
  - Water: 0.81 sq mi (2.1 km^{2}) 1.66%
- Elevation: 659 ft (201 m)

Population (2020)
  - Total: 9,402
  - Density: 160.5/sq mi (62.0/km^{2})
- Time zone: UTC-5 (Eastern (EST))
  - Summer (DST): UTC-4 (EDT)
- ZIP codes: 47906, 47920
- Area code: 765
- GNIS feature ID: 453898

Tippecanoe Township is one of thirteen townships in Tippecanoe County, Indiana, United States. As of the 2010 census, its population was 7,702 and it contained 3,085 housing units.

== History ==
Archeological Sites 12T59 and 12T530, Cairo Skywatch Tower, and Indiana State Soldiers Home Historic District are listed on the National Register of Historic Places.

== Geography ==
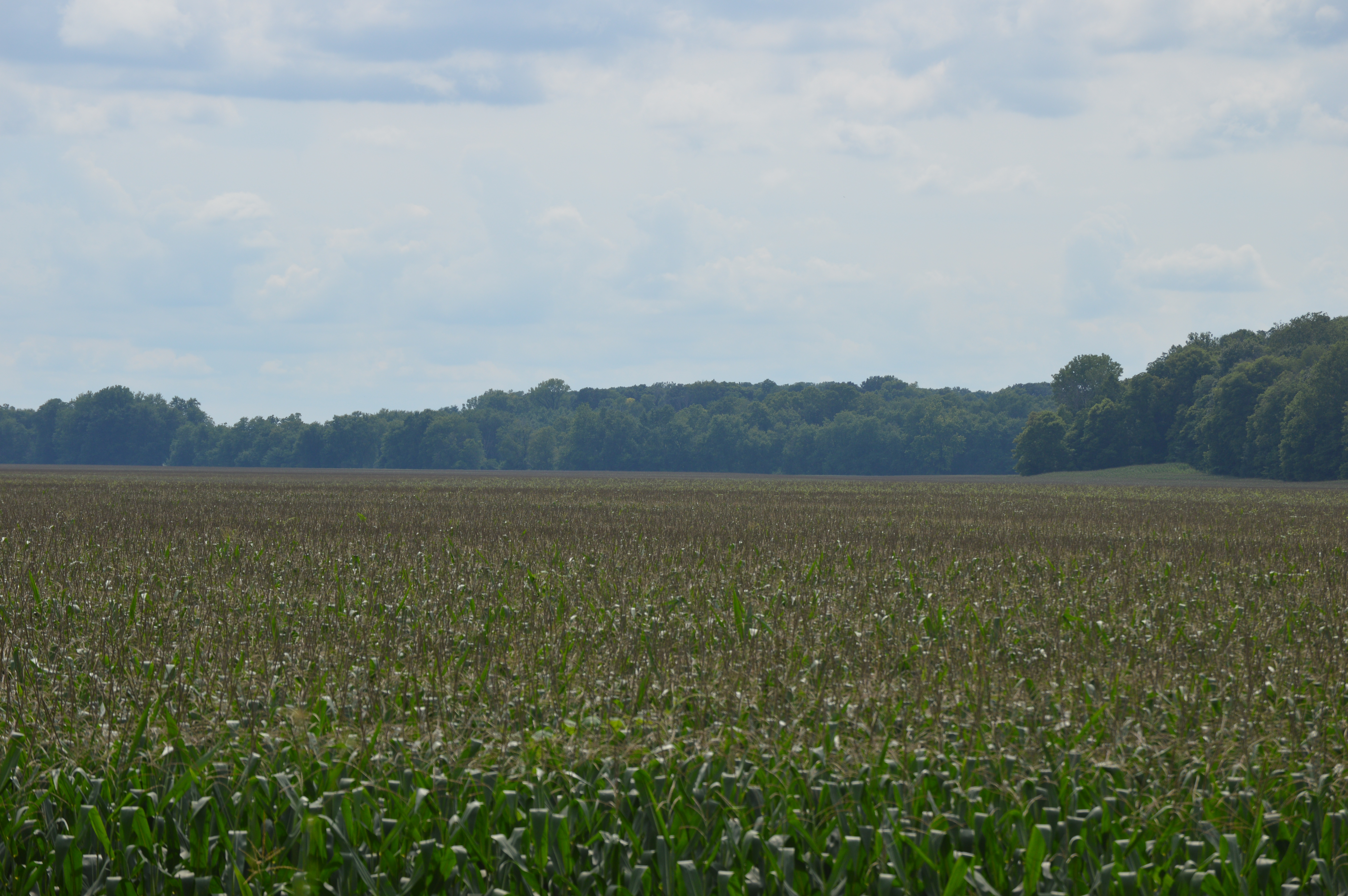
Fields east of Prophetstown State Park

According to the 2010 census, the township has a total area of 48.81 square miles (126.4 km^{2}), of which 48 square miles (120 km^{2}) (or 98.34%) is land and 0.81 square miles (2.1 km^{2}) (or 1.66%) is water.

=== Cities and towns ===
- Battle Ground
- West Lafayette (northeast edge)

=== Unincorporated communities ===
- Cairo at 40.5408685°N 86.9247344°W

(This list is based on USGS data and may include former settlements.)

=== Extinct towns ===
- Harrisonville

=== Adjacent townships ===
- Prairie Township, White County (north)
- Deer Creek Township, Carroll County (east)
- Washington Township (east)
- Fairfield Township (south)
- Wabash Township (southwest)

=== Cemeteries ===
The township contains these six cemeteries: Battle Ground, Cairo, Harvey, Pierce, Pretty Prairie and Swisher-Hurtz.

=== Major highways ===
- Interstate 65
- Indiana State Road 43

=== Airports and landing strips ===
- Oahnke Airport

=== Rivers ===
- Tippecanoe River

== School districts ==
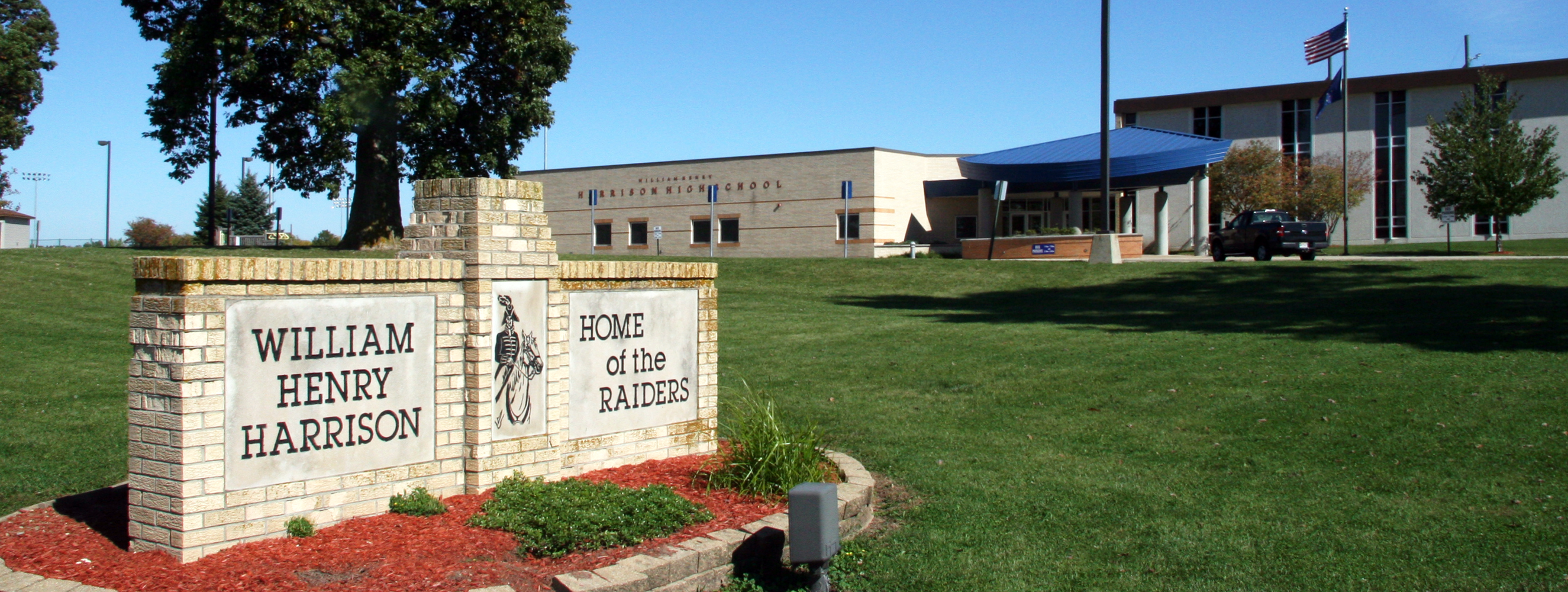
William Henry Harrison High School

- Tippecanoe School Corporation

== Political districts ==
- Indiana's 4th congressional district
- State House District 26
- State House District 41
- State Senate District 07
- After the 2011 redistricting by the Indiana Legislature, Tippecanoe Township will no longer include State House Districts 26 & 41 but instead will be included in State House District 25. http://www.in.gov/legislative/house_republicans/rd/pdfs/House.pdf
