= Albert Pearson Stewart =

American musical director

- Born: September 15, 1907; Lafayette, IN
- Died: January 24, 1991 (aged 83); West Lafayette, IN
- Education: Purdue University, DePauw University, American Conservatory of Music
- Occupations: Founder & Director, Purdue Musical Organizations
- Years active: 1930–1974
- Known for: "There is no fun without music, and no music without fun."
- Spouse: Charlotte Friend Stewart (Mar. 1933)
- Website: https://www.purdue.edu/pmo/

Beginning in 1933, Albert Pearson Stewart was the first director of the Purdue Musical Organizations. Stewart directed the Purdue Varsity Glee Club, Purduettes, and other singing groups until his retirement in June, 1974. Stewart received an honorary doctoral degree in music from DePauw University and was given the title of director emeritus at Purdue University after retirement. Stewart is a beloved figure in Purdue University history.

== Early life, education ==
Albert Pearson Stewart was born on September 15, 1907, in Lafayette, Indiana. Stewart attended West Lafayette High School and after graduation studied at Purdue University for one year. Stewart later transferred to DePauw University and studied music from 1929 to 1930. Stewart left DePauw for financial reasons and returned to Lafayette where he worked as a voice coach at the Lafayette Conservatory of Music. After becoming head of the Purdue Musical Organizations, Stewart married Charlotte Lucille Friend on June 26, 1933. Friend was an accomplished singer and had attended DePauw university where she studied music. Stewart also attended the American Conservatory of Music in Chicago to receive more formal music training.

== Purdue musical organizations ==
Stewart was invited to lead the Purdue Women's Glee Club in 1930. He also decided to ask Purdue President Edward C. Elliott about receiving funds to start a men's glee club. Famously, President Elliott stated that Stewart would not receive "one damn penny" for music from the university. Undeterred, Stewart asked President Elliott for permission to use the Purdue Glee Club name to start a singing group on campus. In 1933, President Elliott decided to fund Stewart's efforts and the Purdue Musical Organizations was founded with Stewart as its director.

In 1940, the Purdue Hall of Music was dedicated. Despite vowing to never spend a penny for music at Purdue, President Elliott had secured the funds for a 6,000 seat, state of the art theater. The theater was later named the Edward C. Elliott Hall of Music in 1958. After getting the go-ahead to build the new music hall, Elliott called Stewart, who had been away from campus, and told him to prepare to showcase the university's talent in the new music hall. Bronze busts of both Elliott and Stewart now adorn the back of the music hall.

Stewart initiated the first PMO Christmas Show in 1933. Originally held in Fowler Hall, the show had 200 people in attendance. The Christmas Show continued and grew each year. After 1941, the Christmas Shows were held in the Elliott Hall of Music with Stewart as director. In 1998, the American Bus Association named the PMO Christmas Show among its top 100 events of North America.

In 1942, the Purdue Glee Club was selected to participate in radio entertainer Fred Waring's National Glee Club Competition held at Radio City Music Hall in New York City. The competition featured eight schools that had remained after an initial entry of 248 collegiate glee programs. Purdue achieved second place in the competition, and the Purdue Glee Club and Al Stewart received national attention.

Facing a shortage of male singers due to involvement in World War II, Stewart established a female singing group named the Purduettes in 1942. The group featured 13 singers selected for appearance and singing ability. Stewart toured the East Coast, stopping at the Eastman Kodak Company, boosting the Purduettes in popularity. After World War II, the Purduettes continued as a part of the Purdue Musical Organizations and celebrated their 80th anniversary in 2022.

Al Stewart established West Lafayette as an entertainment destination with Victory Varieties. Starting in 1943, for a quarter century, some of the nation's top entertainment acts performed at the Elliott Hall of Music, and the roster included popular music and comedy performers from the 1940s, 50s, and 60s. The name "Victory" applied to the war effort and was later applied to Purdue athletic teams. The series ended in 1970 mostly due to the costs associated with booking popular musical acts as well as changing tastes in music. Victory Varieties hosted well known performers such as Louis Armstrong, the Beach Boys, Harry Belafonte, Jack Benny, Victor Borge, Ray Charles, Nat King Cole, Duke Ellington, Bob Hope, B.B. King, Peter, Paul, & Mary, Frank Sinatra, Fred Waring, Dean Martin and Jerry Lewis, and Simon and Garfunkle.

Al Stewart and the Purdue Glee Club performed two songs on the Nov 13, 1955 episode of the Ed Sullivan Show.

Stewart was asked to be the master of ceremonies for the 1956 Republican convention. He had met Mamie and President Eisenhower at the previous convention in 1952. Stewart shared duties with actor Wendel Corey and musical performers included Irving Berlin and Nat King Cole. Stewart drew the praise of Vice President Richard Nixon who, addressing Al Stewart, stated: "The Purdue Glee Club certainly performed most ably and we thoroughly enjoyed their singing. The inspiring 'Peace on Earth' in which you directed the combined chorus was a real highlight of the afternoon."

After the 1956 election year, the Purdue Glee Club sang at the second inauguration of President Eisenhower in 1957. The Glee Club singers performed "Mamie" for Mamie Eisenhower as they passed by the president's reviewing stand.

== Retirement and legacy ==
Due to a mandatory retirement rule, Al Stewart retired from the Purdue Musical Organizations on June 30, 1974, after 41 years of service. Stewart was named director-emeritus of the Glee Club by the board of trustees. Stewart was succeeded by Bill Luhman who had been a PMO accompanist for 20 years and an associated director since 1967 under Stewart.

In the summer of 1972, Stewart accompanied 122 singers to Hawaii where they performed at the Honolulu Concert Hall and the "Shriner's Hospitals for Crippled Children." The singers consisted of the Varsity Glee Club, Purduettes, and Purdue Extension Chorus. Up to this time, along with the Hawaiian trip, Purdue singers had performed in over 35 countries.

The Albert P. Stewart Directorship Endowment of $1.5 million was established to help fund the Purdue Varsity Glee Club.

Stewart and the Glee Club participated in a multiple sclerosis (MS) campaign for several years as a community affairs project. In 1964–1965, Stewart served as the chairman of the MS Hope campaign in Indiana. Project Mercury, Gemini, and Apollo astronaut Major Virgil I. (Gus) Grissom, a 1950 graduate of Purdue, served as honorary chairman.

Stewart was the director of the Tippecanoe County Heritage 75*76 Board which was tasked with celebrating the 150th anniversary of the founding of Lafayette, Indiana and the 1976 U.S. Bicentennial year. The Heritage 75*76 Board raised funds to construct a rotating sculpture named Ouabache to commemorate the two anniversaries. The sculpture was installed in downtown Lafayette near the Tippecanoe County Courthouse in 1976. The sculpture was later moved in 1995 to a location overlooking the Wabash River.

In 1986, author Joseph L. Bennett published a 182-page book telling Stewart's story and the development of the Purdue Musical Organizations. "Boilermaker Music Makers" was published by the Purdue University Press.

Al Stewart died on Jan 24, 1991 at his home in West Lafayette. He had been in "failing health" for several years. Charlotte Stewart had preceded him in death on July 19, 1984.
