= James Pierce Jr. House =

Historic house in Indiana, United States

- U.S. National Register of Historic Places
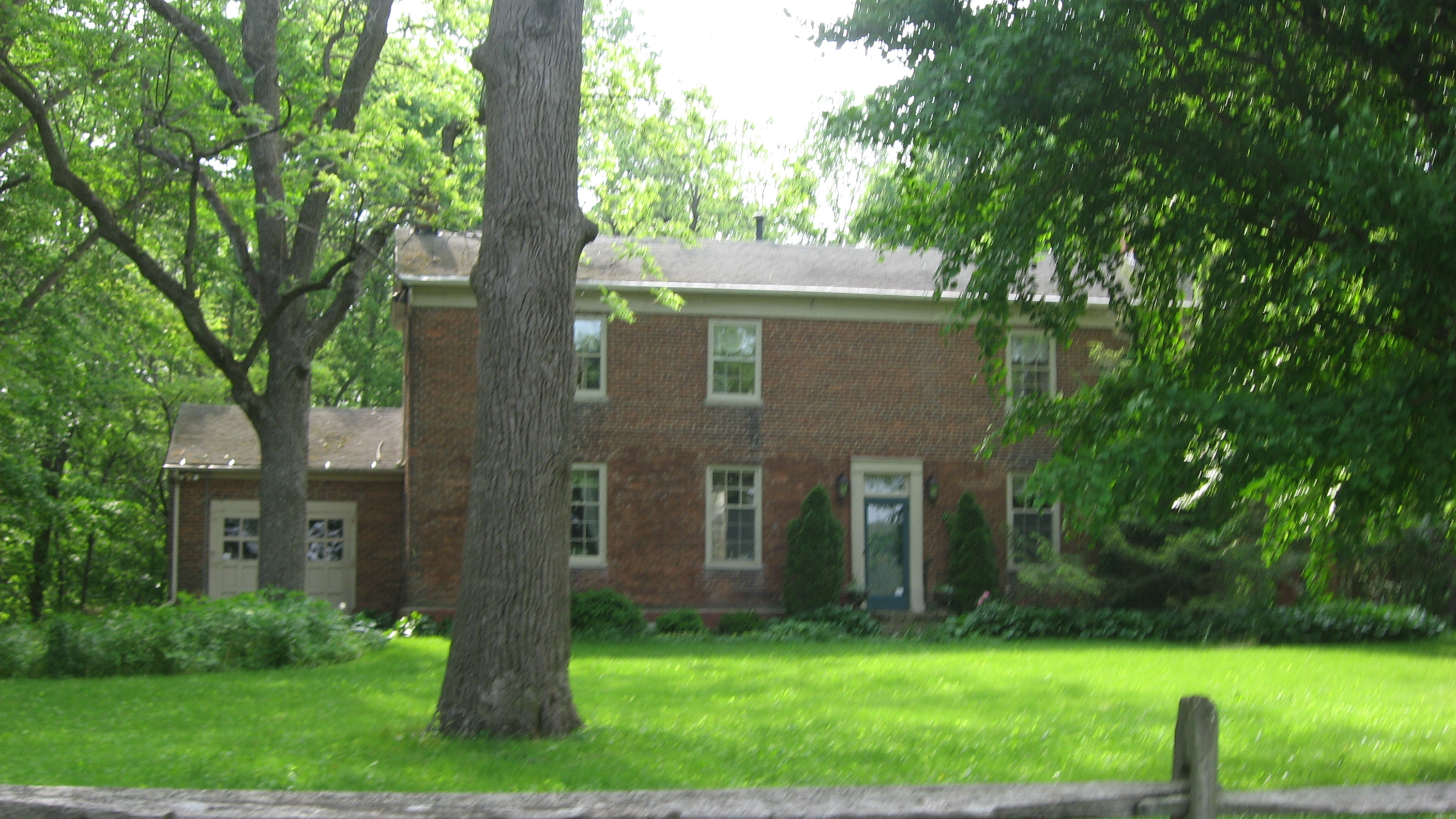
- James Pierce Jr. House, May 2011

- Location within Tippecanoe County, Indiana Location within Indiana Location within the United States
- Location: 4623 N., 140 W., north of West Lafayette in Wabash Township, Tippecanoe County, Indiana
- Coordinates: 40°29′6″N 86°55′56″W
- Area: 3.1 acres (1.3 ha)
- Built: 1833-1834
- Built by: Pierce, James, Jr.
- Architectural style: Federalist
- NRHP reference No.: 82000079
- Added to NRHP: June 17, 1982

James Pierce Jr. House, also known as Piercestead, is a historic home located in Wabash Township, Tippecanoe County, Indiana. It was built in 1833–1834, and is a two-story, Greek Revival style brick dwelling, with a one-story rear ell and one-story wing. It is four bays wide and has a slate gable roof. It also housed the Cass Post Office between 1846 and 1855.

It was listed on the National Register of Historic Places in 1982.
