= Klondike, Indiana =

- Unincorporated community
- Tippecanoe County's location in Indiana

- Location in Tippecanoe County
- Coordinates: 40°28′03″N 86°57′44″W
- Country: United States
- State: Indiana
- County: Tippecanoe
- Township: Wabash
- Elevation: 659 ft (201 m)
- Time zone: UTC-5 (Eastern (EST))
  - Summer (DST): UTC-4 (EDT)
- ZIP code: 47906
- Area code: 765
- GNIS feature ID: 437378

Klondike is an unincorporated community in Wabash Township, Tippecanoe County, in the U.S. state of Indiana.

The community is part of the Lafayette, Indiana Metropolitan Statistical Area.

== History ==
A post office was established at Klondike in 1897, and remained in operation until it was discontinued in 1900. On March 20, 1976, an EF4 tornado touched down in Klondike, with golf ball sized hail.

== Education ==
Klondike is served by the Klondike Branch public library, a branch of the Tippecanoe County Public Library.
