= Cairo Skywatch Tower =

- U.S. National Register of Historic Places
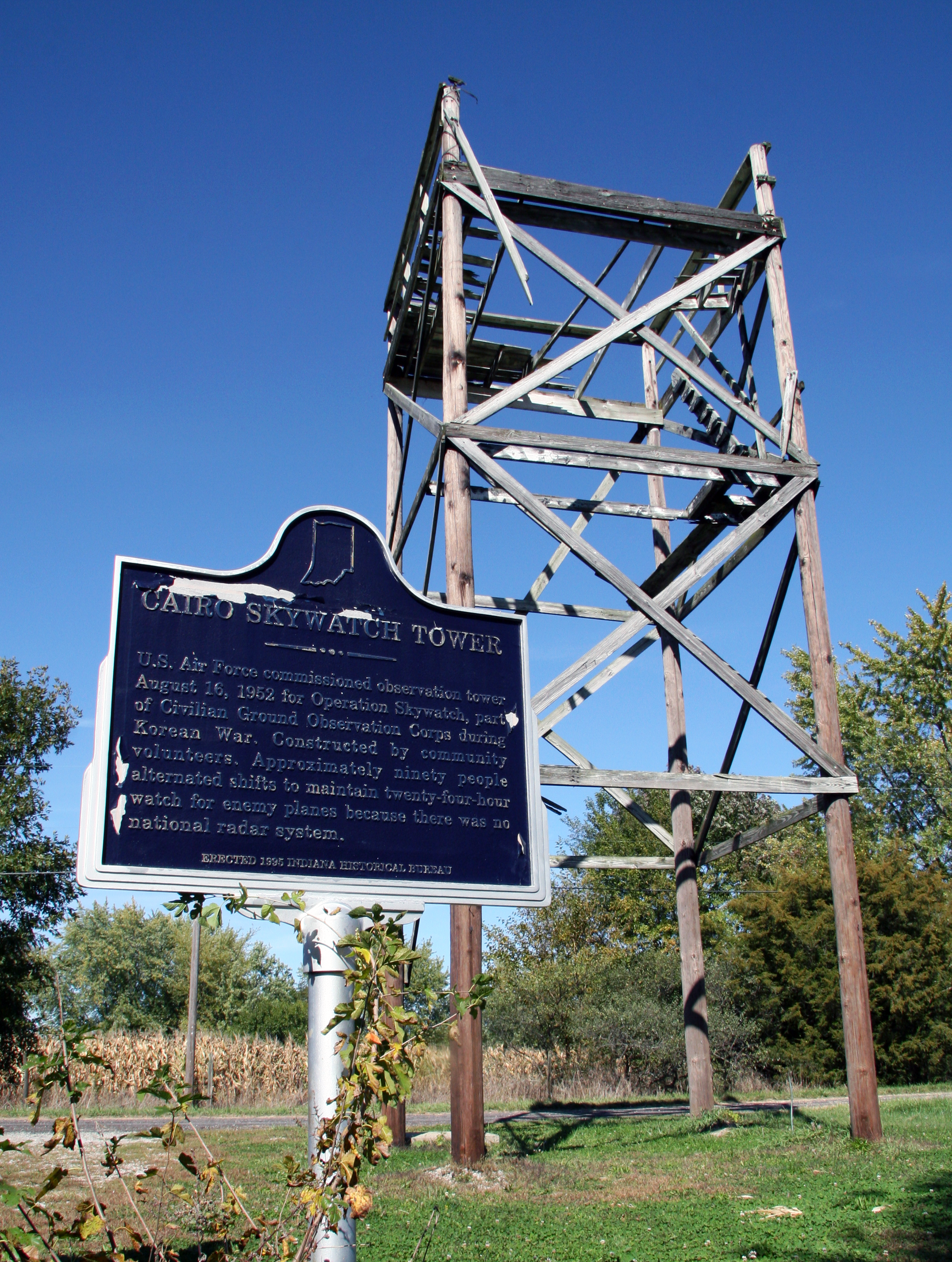
- Cairo Skywatch Tower, October 2008

- Location within Tippecanoe County, Indiana Location within Indiana Location within the United States
- Location: County Road 850N at County Road 100W at Cairo, Indiana
- Coordinates: 40°32′26″N 86°55′30″W
- Area: 0 acres (0 ha)
- Built: 1952
- NRHP reference No.: 02000202
- Added to NRHP: March 21, 2002

Cairo Skywatch Tower, also known as Delta Lima 3 Green Ground Observation Tower, is a historic watchtower located in Tippecanoe Township, Tippecanoe County, Indiana. It was built in 1952, and is a 40-foot tall wooden structure. It once had a glass-enclosed office. It was the first officially commissioned rural skywatch tower by the United States Air Force's Civilian Ground Observation Corps under the Operation Skywatch program. In 1959, after the dissolution of the Civilian Ground Observation Corps, the watchtower was abandoned.

It was listed on the National Register of Historic Places in 2002.
