= Wolf Park =

Nonprofit organization in Indiana, United States

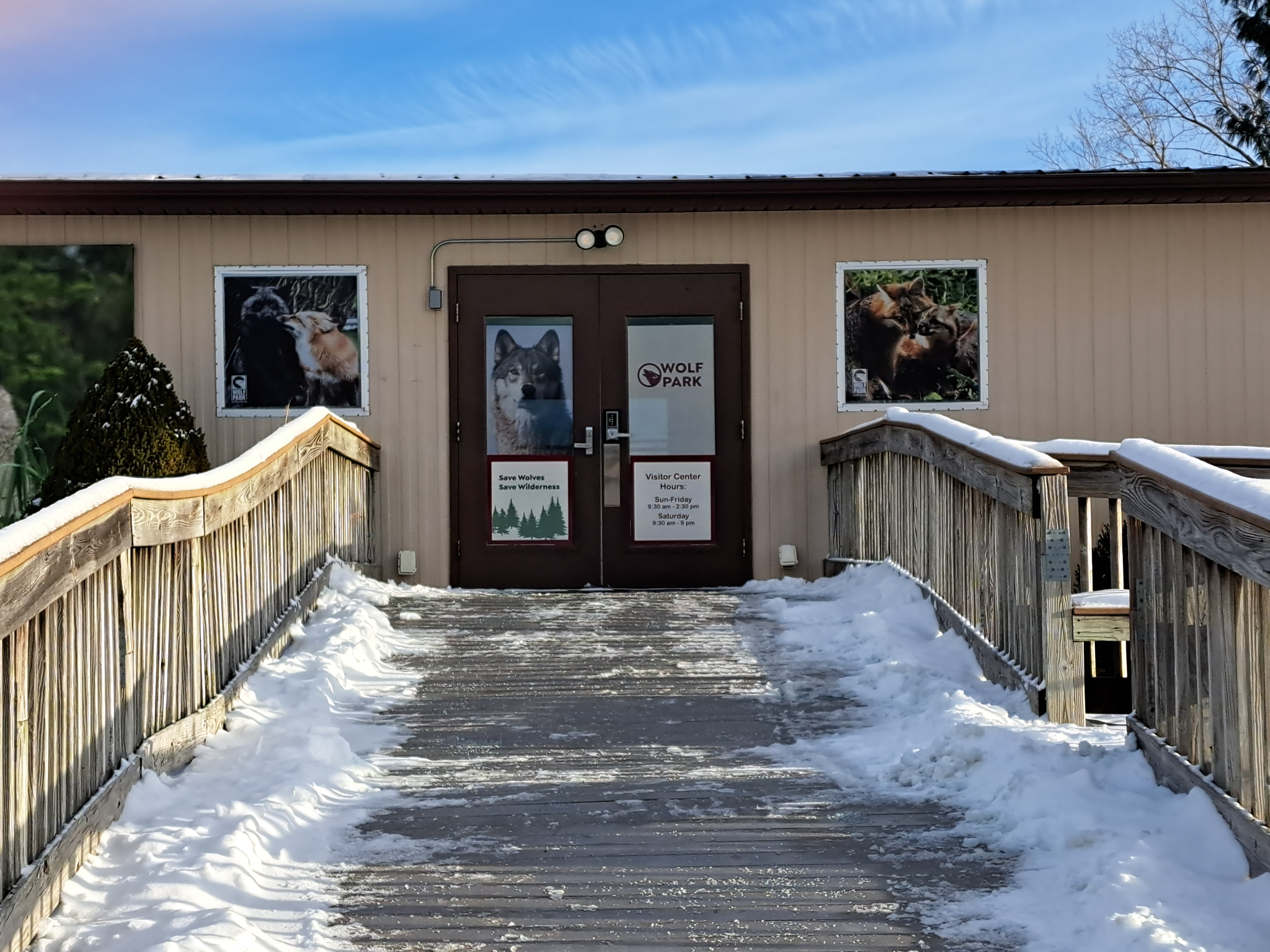
- The Visitor Center entrance at Wolf Park.
- Interactive map of Wolf Park
- 40.5363584°N 86.828842°W
- Date opened: 1972
- Location: Battle Ground, Indiana, United States
- Website: wolfpark.org

Wolf Park is a nonprofit education and research facility in Battle Ground, Indiana, United States, established in 1972 by Dr. Erich Klinghammer.

Along with research and seminars on wolf behavior, particularly reproductive and inter-pack social behavior, Wolf Park provides interpretive programs to school groups and the public throughout the year. They provide a variety of day tours along with their popular evening "Howl Night" programs on weekends. The park is home to several packs of wolves, along with foxes, bison, and other North American species. Displays and landscaping focuses on backyard habitats and protecting native species.

They are incorporated under Wolf Park, Inc.

== See also ==
- History of wolves in Yellowstone
