= Harrisonville, Indiana =

- Ghost town
- Tippecanoe County's location in Indiana

- Location in Tippecanoe County
- Coordinates: 40°30′50″N 86°49′33″W
- Country: United States
- State: Indiana
- County: Tippecanoe
- Township: Tippecanoe
- Time zone: UTC-5 (Eastern (EST))
  - Summer (DST): UTC-4 (EDT)
- ZIP code: 47920
- Area code: 765

Harrisonville was a small town, now extinct, in Tippecanoe Township, Tippecanoe County, in the U.S. state of Indiana.

The community is now part of the town of Battle Ground.

== History ==
Harrisonville was founded in 1834 by John Burget. A post office was established at Harrisonville in 1835, but was discontinued in that same year.

== Geography ==
Harrisonville was located at 40°30′50″N 86°49′33″W.
