= Green Meadows, Indiana =

- subdivision
- Tippecanoe County's location in Indiana

- Location in Tippecanoe County
- Coordinates: 40°26′23″N 86°57′57″W
- Country: United States
- State: Indiana
- County: Tippecanoe
- Township: Wabash
- Elevation: 709 ft (216 m)
- Time zone: UTC-5 (Eastern (EST))
  - Summer (DST): UTC-4 (EDT)
- ZIP code: 47906
- Area code: 765
- GNIS feature ID: 435408

Green Meadows is a subdivision in Wabash Township, Tippecanoe County, in the U.S. state of Indiana. It is part of the Lafayette, Indiana, Metropolitan Statistical Area.

In 1959, development began on a 102-acre plat bounded by Indiana Highway 26, Klondike Road, and Lindbergh Road. The development included a privately owned sewage disposal system and central water system, one of the first subdivisions in the state to do so.

In 1990, the state started an investigation into malfeasance at the Green Meadows Utility company, and later that year stepped in to require improvements to the water service. In 1992 the water utility was acquired by West Lafayette Water company.

In the early 2000s, reports began to surface about cancer clusters in Green Meadows, pointing potential blame on hazardous waste dumped in landfills operated on the Purdue University Thomas Horticultural Farm, which was adjacent to the Green Meadows water source.
