= Prague Quadrennial =

Held in Prague once every four years since 1967, the Prague Quadrennial of Performance Design and Space or Prague Quadrennial is the world's largest event in the field of scenography, consisting of a competitive presentation of contemporary work in a variety of performance design disciplines and genres including costume, stage, lighting, sound design, and theatre architecture for dance, opera, drama, site-specific, multi-media performances, and performance art. Informally considered the 'Olympics of Scenography' alongside Exhibition of Countries and Regions and the Student Exhibition is a curated program of performances, talks, workshops, and other displays. The event now attracts over 10,000 visitors over 10 days in June.

== History ==
During the São Paulo Art Biennial in 1959, a special exhibit, designed by František Tröster, illustrated the development of Czech and Slovak stage design and theatre architecture during the period from 1914-1959. The result of the exhibition was a gold medal for Czechoslovakia. Continued Czech success during the next three Biennales led to an offer for Prague to host an international exhibition of stage design in Europe. Since its premiere in 1967, the international exhibition has been held regularly every four years, and has come to be known as the Prague Quadrennial.

Important artists who marked the history of the theater and the scenography participated and exposed at the Prague Quadrennial, such as Salvador Dalí, Josef Svoboda, Oscar Niemayer, Tadeusz Kantor, Guy-Claude François and Ralph Koltai, as well as figures of the contemporary theater, such as Robert Wilson, Heiner Goebbels and Renzo Piano.

== Awards ==
The exhibitions are judged and estimated by an International Jury, attributing the following awards:

- Golden Triga for the Best Exposition
- Gold Medal for the Best Stage Design
- Gold Medal for the Best Theatre Costume
- Gold Medal for the Best Realization of a Production
- Gold Medal for the Best Work in Theatre Architecture and Performance Space
- Gold Medal for the Best Use of Theatre Technology
- Gold Medal for the Best Exposition in the Student Section
- Gold Medal for the Most Promising Talent in the Student Section
- Gold Medal for the Best Curatorial Concept of an Exposition

The Golden Triga was awarded in 1967 to France, in 1971 to the GDR, in 1975 to the USSR, in 1979 to Great Britain, in 1983 to the GDR, in 1987 to the USA, in 1991 to Great Britain, in 1995 to Brazil, in 1999 to the Czech Republic, in 2003 to Great Britain, in 2007 to Russia, in 2011 to Turkey, in 2015 to Estonia, in 2019 to Republic of North Macedonia and in 2023 to Cyprus.
