= Battle Ground Historic District =

Historic district in Indiana, United States

- U.S. National Register of Historic Places
- U.S. Historic district
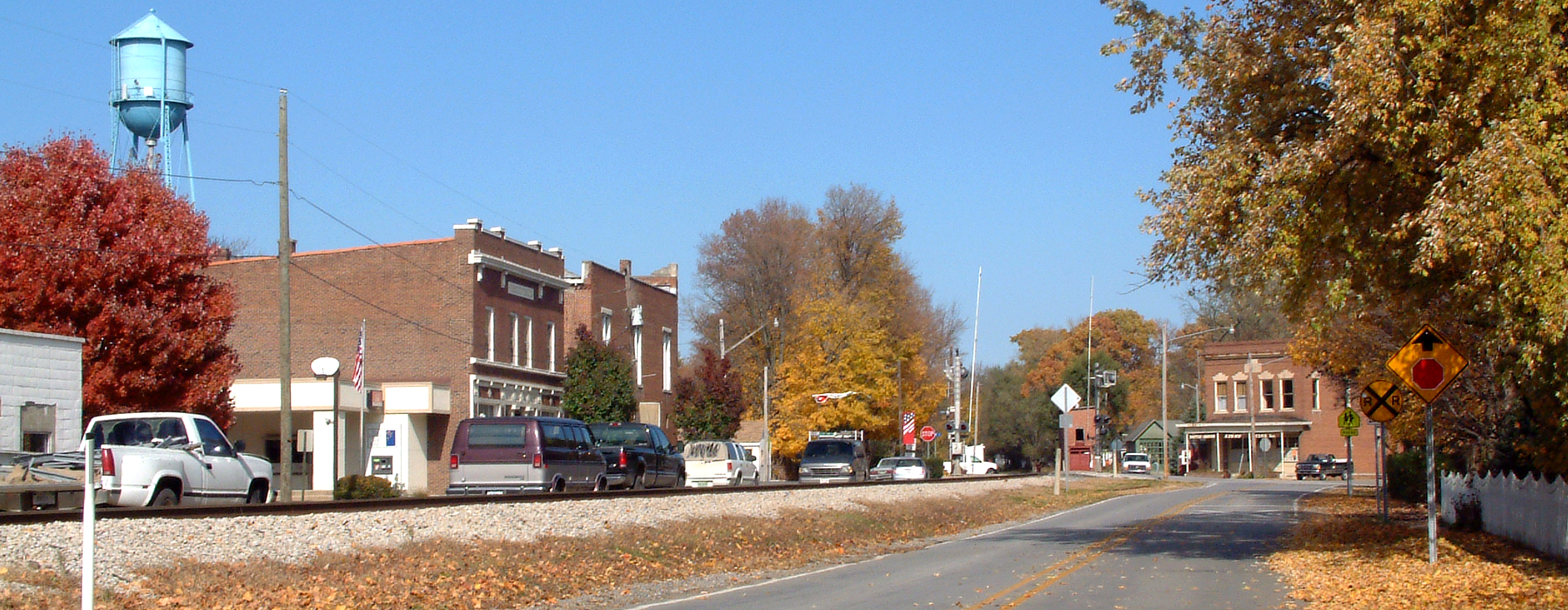
- Battle Ground, Indiana, October 2006

- Location within Tippecanoe County, Indiana Location within Indiana Location within the United States
- Location: Roughly bounded by Burnett Creek, Sherman Dr. and an open ridge on the SE, Battle Ground, Indiana
- Coordinates: 40°30′35″N 86°50′21″W
- Area: 81 acres (33 ha)
- Built: 1811
- Architect: Multiple
- Architectural style: Late Victorian, Colonial, Dutch Colonial
- NRHP reference No.: 85001639
- Added to NRHP: July 23, 1985

Battle Ground Historic District is a national historic district located at Battle Ground, Indiana. The district encompasses 129 contributing buildings in the central business district of Battle Ground, including the site of the Battle of Tippecanoe. It developed between about 1811 and 1930 and includes representative examples of Queen Anne, Colonial Revival, and Bungalow / American Craftsman style architecture. Notable contributing resources include the Soldier's Memorial (1908), Carpenter Hall / Service Center (c. 1884, 1926), Chapel (c. 1825), Winans House (c. 1863), Battle Ground United Methodist Church (1920), Masonic Lodge (c. 1918), Odd Fellow Lodge (1899), and Knights of Pythias Lodge (1899).

It was listed on the National Register of Historic Places in 1985.
