= Cairo, Indiana =

- Unincorporated community
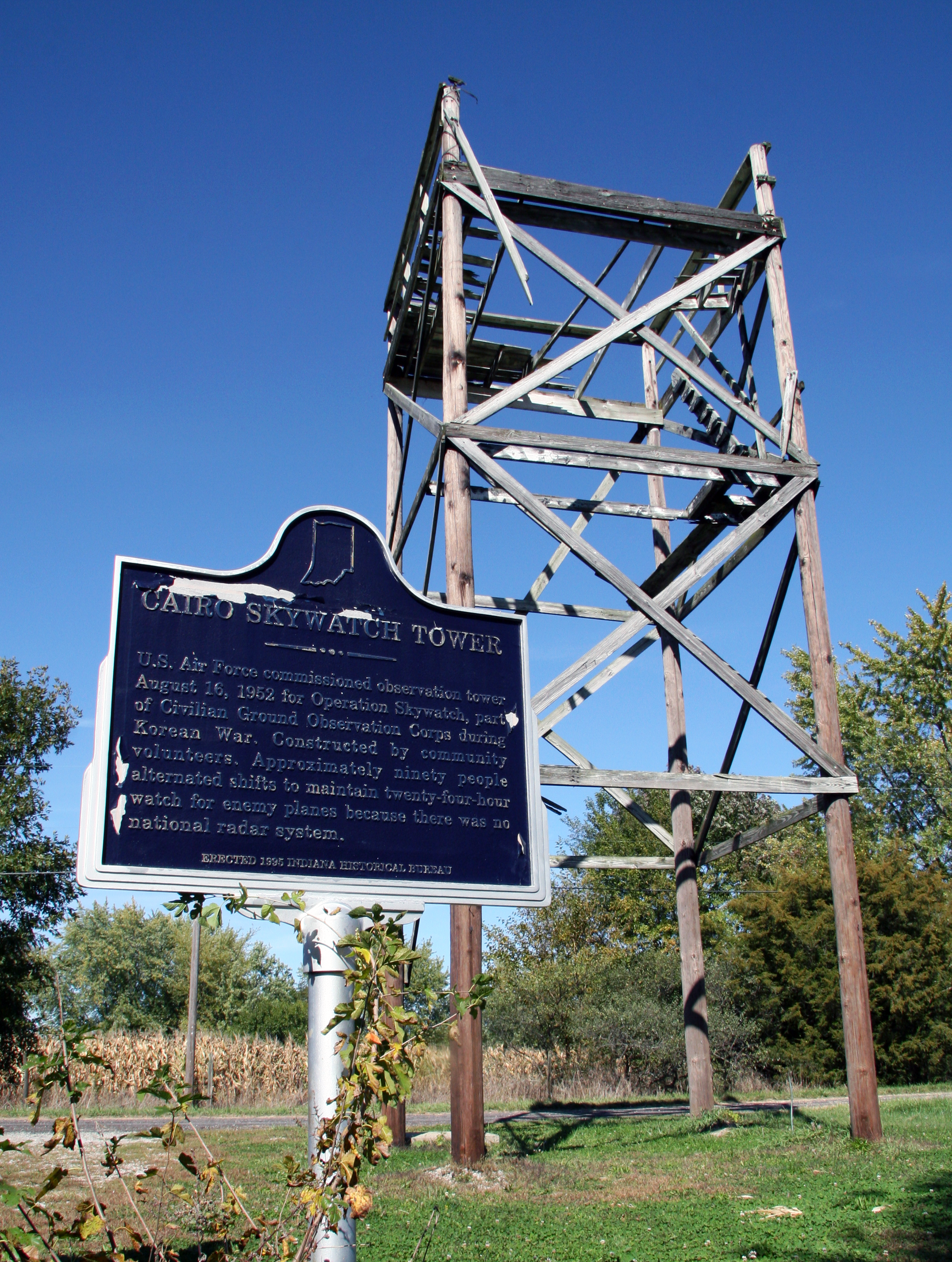
- Cairo Skywatch Tower

- Tippecanoe County's location in Indiana

- Location in Tippecanoe County
- Coordinates: 40°32′27″N 86°55′29″W
- Country: United States
- State: Indiana
- County: Tippecanoe
- Township: Tippecanoe
- Elevation: 689 ft (210 m)
- Time zone: UTC-5 (Eastern (EST))
  - Summer (DST): UTC-4 (EDT)
- ZIP code: 47906
- Area code: 765
- GNIS feature ID: 431946

Cairo is an unincorporated community in Tippecanoe Township, Tippecanoe County, in the U.S. state of Indiana.

The community is part of the Lafayette, Indiana Metropolitan Statistical Area.

== Skywatch Tower ==
In 1952 the US Air Force commissioned the construction of an observation tower in Cairo, which was built by local volunteers. Manned twenty-four hours a day, observers kept watch for enemy aircraft until being the advent of the national radar system.
