= Battle Ground, Indiana =

Town in Indiana, US

- Town
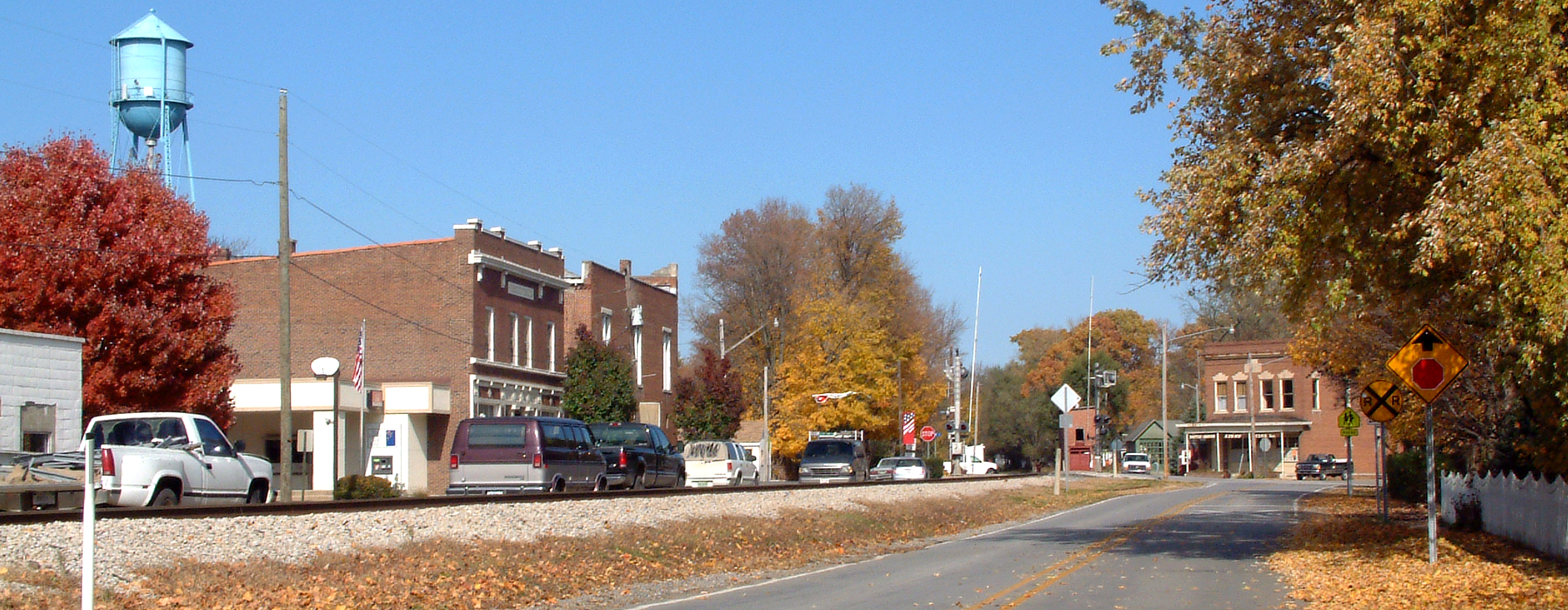
- Motto: "Historic Site of the Battle of Tippecanoe"
- Location of Battle Ground in Tippecanoe County, Indiana.
- Coordinates: 40°30′16″N 86°51′28″W
- Country: United States
- State: Indiana
- County: Tippecanoe
- Township: Tippecanoe
- Incorporated: 1867

Government
  - Council President: Steve Egly

Area
  - Town: 1.02 sq mi (2.64 km^{2})
  - Land: 1.02 sq mi (2.64 km^{2})
  - Water: 0 sq mi (0.00 km^{2})
- Elevation: 650 ft (200 m)

Population (2020)
  - Town: 1,838
  - Density: 1,802.2/sq mi (695.82/km^{2})
  - Metro: 190,386
- Time zone: UTC−5 (Eastern (EST))
  - Summer (DST): UTC−4 (EDT)
- ZIP Code: 47920
- Area code: 765
- FIPS code: 18-03718
- GNIS feature ID: 2396586
- Website: www.in.gov/towns/battle-ground/

Battle Ground is a town in Tippecanoe Township, Tippecanoe County in the U.S. state of Indiana. The population was 1,838 at the 2020 census. It is near the site of the Battle of Tippecanoe.

Battle Ground is part of the Lafayette, Indiana, Metropolitan Statistical Area.

== History ==
In the late summer and the fall of 1811, William Henry Harrison, the governor of the Indiana Territory, organized a military expedition against the increasing resistance of the federation of Native American tribes being formed by the Shawnee brothers and chiefs, Tecumseh and Tenskwatawa, who was also known as the Prophet. With their community of Prophetstown as his objective, General Harrison marched from Vincennes, Indiana, at the head of a small army of about 1,000 men.

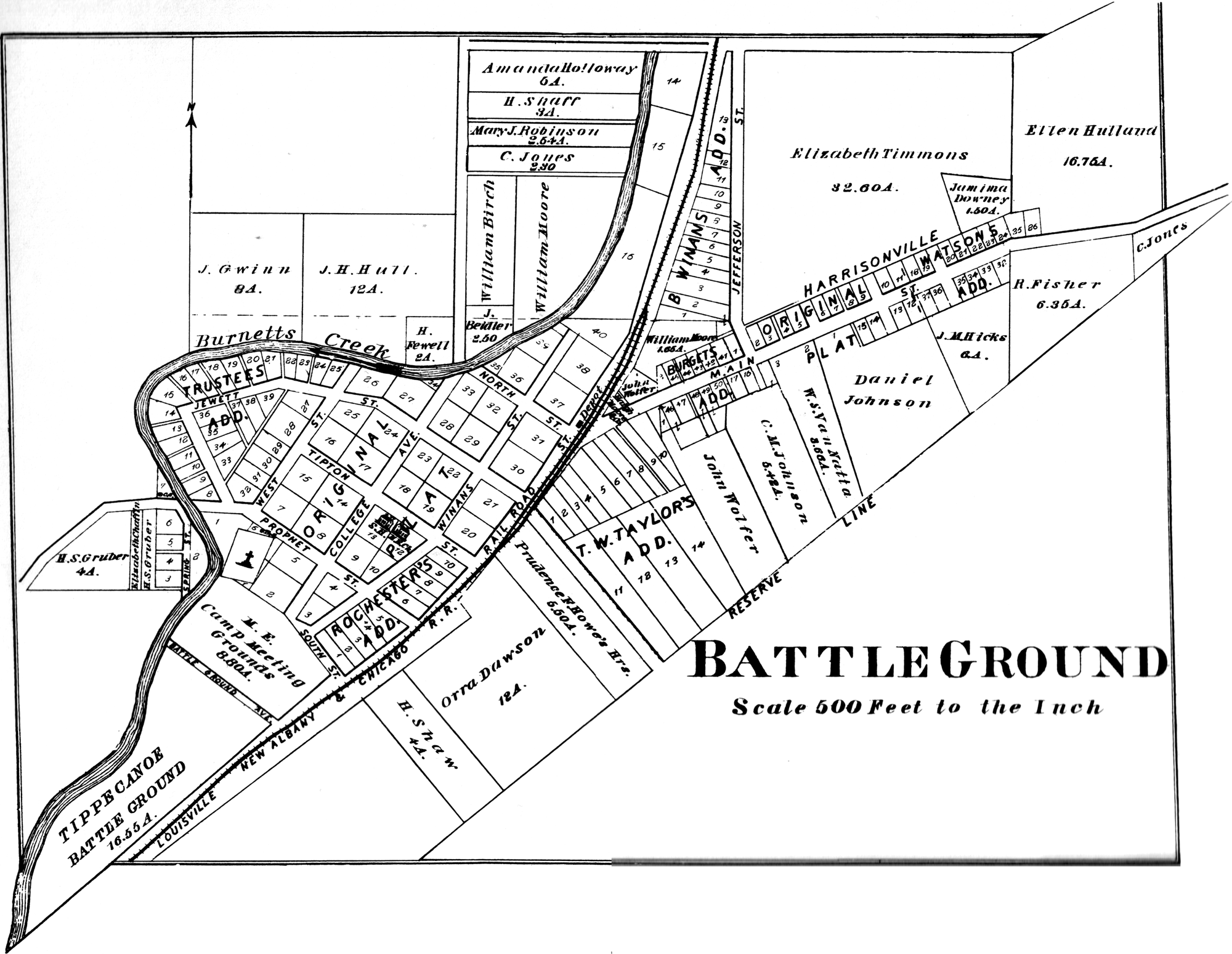
Battle Ground in 1878.

General Harrison met with representatives of the Prophet on November 6, 1811, when he arrived at Prophetstown. He presented demands in the name of his government. Harrison was to meet with the Prophet and his council the next day about the demands of the government. Harrison set up his encampment on a ridge about a mile northwest of Prophet's Town.

Fearing a surprise attack by the Prophet's forces, General Harrison placed his troops in battle formation, instructed his men to sleep fully clothed, and assigned a large detail of men for sentinel duty. On the morning of November 7, 1811, after 4:00, the camp was attacked by the Prophet.

After a fierce battle, Harrison and his army defeated the Prophet's Indian confederation at the Battle of Tippecanoe. The defeat all but ended the Indian wars in the Midwest, especially as Tecumseh was killed at the Battle of the Thames in Canada in 1813.

Battle Ground was incorporated in 1867 when it consolidated with the Town of Harrisonville. The governments of both towns decided to name the consolidation Battle Ground. The Town of Battle Ground was named for the Battle of Tippecanoe, and the Town of Harrisonville was named after Harrison, the commander of the American forces of the Battle of Tippecanoe.

The Tippecanoe Battlefield monument was erected in 1908 and dedicated to the men who served and were killed in the Battle of Tippecanoe. The battlefield has been designated a National Historic Landmark and includes a museum and recreation area. The Battle of Tippecanoe Outdoor Drama premiered at a nearby amphitheater in Battle Ground in 1989 and played for two summers.

The post office at Battle Ground has been in operation since 1835.

Battle Ground Historic District was listed on the National Register of Historic Places in 1985.

== Geography ==
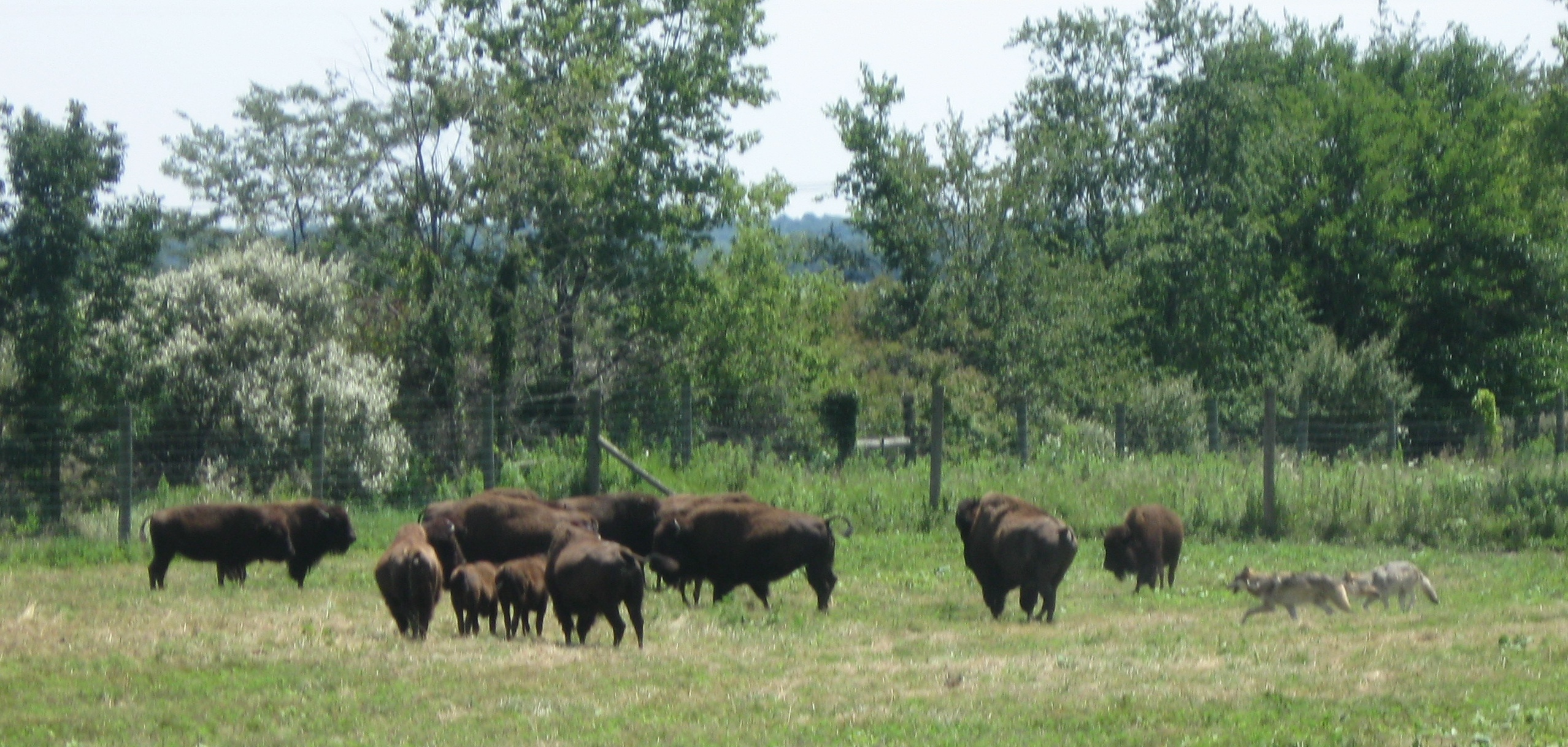
The long-discontinued Wolf-Bison Demonstration at the institute of Wolf Park, Battle Ground.

Battle Ground is located in Tippecanoe Township, one and a quarter miles northwest of the Wabash River. Its elevation is approximately 585 feet. The small Harrison Creek begins near Battle Ground and flows east, while Burnett Creek skirts the town's western edge and flows southwest.

According to the 2010 census, Battle Ground has a total area of 0.86 square miles (2.23 km^{2}), all land.

== Demographics ==
Historical population
Census	Pop.	Note	%±
1890	456		—
1900	150		−67.1%
1910	443		195.3%
1920	444		0.2%
1930	448		0.9%
1940	506		12.9%
1950	634		25.3%
1960	804		26.8%
1970	818		1.7%
1980	812		−0.7%
1990	806		−0.7%
2000	1,323		64.1%
2010	1,334		0.8%
2020	1,838		37.8%
U.S. Decennial Census

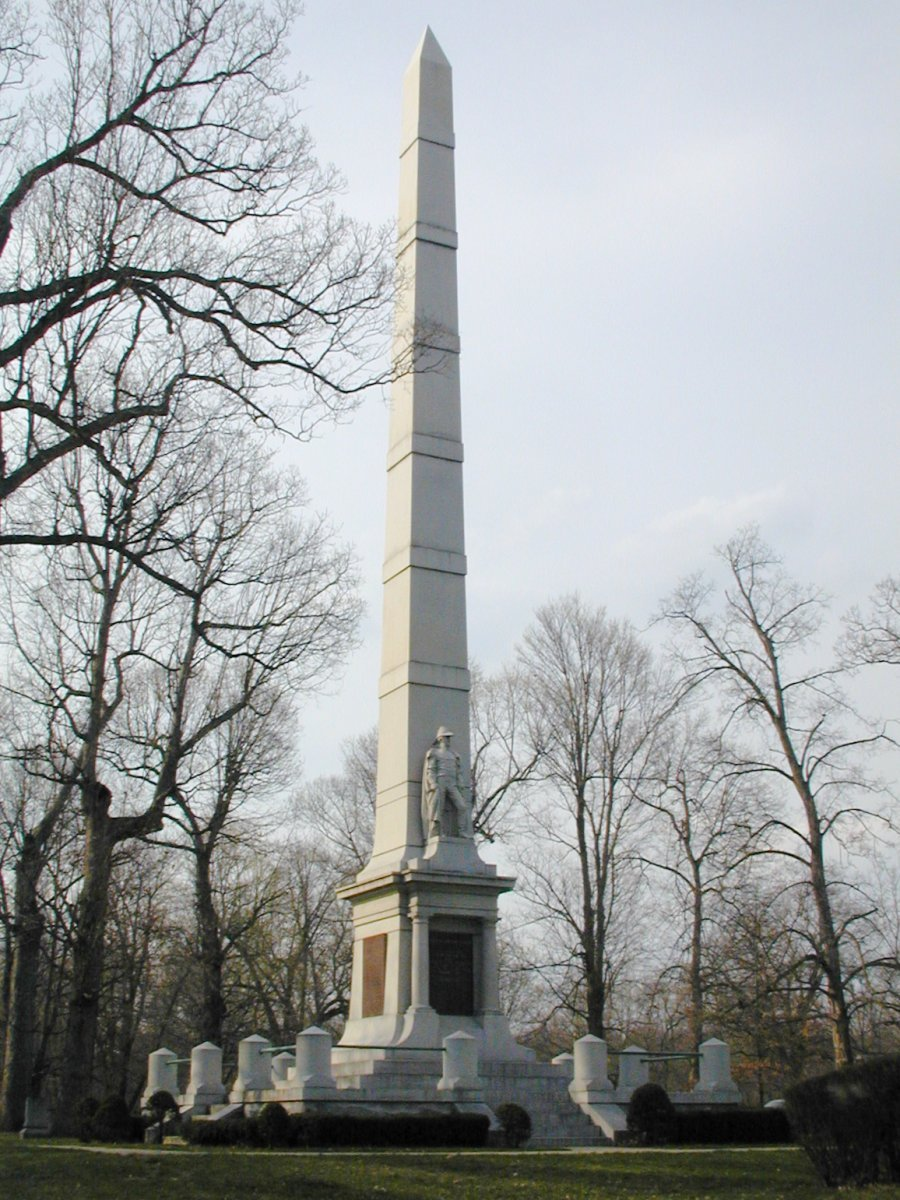
Tippecanoe Battlefield Monument

=== 2020 census ===
As of the 2020 census, Battle Ground had a population of 1,838. The median age was 37.0 years. 26.5% of residents were under the age of 18 and 14.1% of residents were 65 years of age or older. For every 100 females there were 91.5 males, and for every 100 females age 18 and over there were 88.2 males age 18 and over.

0.0% of residents lived in urban areas, while 100.0% lived in rural areas.

There were 675 households in Battle Ground, of which 38.1% had children under the age of 18 living in them. Of all households, 62.1% were married-couple households, 12.1% were households with a male householder and no spouse or partner present, and 20.9% were households with a female householder and no spouse or partner present. About 18.9% of all households were made up of individuals and 6.3% had someone living alone who was 65 years of age or older.

There were 706 housing units, of which 4.4% were vacant. The homeowner vacancy rate was 1.3% and the rental vacancy rate was 6.5%.

Racial composition as of the 2020 census
Race	Number	Percent
White	1,657	90.2%
Black or African American	12	0.7%
American Indian and Alaska Native	12	0.7%
Asian	25	1.4%
Native Hawaiian and Other Pacific Islander	0	0.0%
Some other race	24	1.3%
Two or more races	108	5.9%
Hispanic or Latino (of any race)	78	4.2%

=== 2010 census ===
As of the census of 2010, there were 1,334 people, 500 households, and 378 families living in the town. The population density was 1,533.3 inhabitants per square mile (592.0/km^{2}). There were 530 housing units at an average density of 609.2 per square mile (235.2/km^{2}). The racial makeup of the town was 98.2% White, 0.2% African American, 0.1% Native American, 0.2% Asian, 0.7% from other races, and 0.4% from two or more races. Hispanic or Latino of any race were 2.1% of the population.

There were 500 households, of which 37.4% had children under the age of 18 living with them, 60.6% were married couples living together, 11.4% had a female householder with no husband present, 3.6% had a male householder with no wife present, and 24.4% were non-families. 22.2% of all households were made up of individuals, and 5.6% had someone living alone who was 65 years of age or older. The average household size was 2.67 and the average family size was 3.09.

The median age in the town was 38.1 years. 27.3% of residents were under the age of 18; 7.8% were between the ages of 18 and 24; 23.8% were from 25 to 44; 31.6% were from 45 to 64; and 9.3% were 65 years of age or older. The gender makeup of the town was 48.4% male and 51.6% female.

=== 2000 census ===
As of the census of 2000, there were 1,323 people, 470 households, and 375 families living in the town. The population density was 1,152.5 inhabitants per square mile (445.0/km^{2}). There were 486 housing units at an average density of 423.4 per square mile (163.5/km^{2}). The racial makeup of the town was 98.79% White, 0.15% African American, 0.08% Native American, 0.15% Asian, 0.30% from other races, and 0.53% from two or more races. Hispanic or Latino of any race were 1.51% of the population.

There were 470 households, out of which 46.8% had children under the age of 18 living with them, 68.1% were married couples living together, 9.1% had a female householder with no husband present, and 20.2% were non-families. 17.4% of all households were made up of individuals, and 5.7% had someone living alone who was 65 years of age or older. The average household size was 2.81 and the average family size was 3.18.

In the town, the population was spread out, with 31.6% under the age of 18, 5.8% from 18 to 24, 35.3% from 25 to 44, 21.7% from 45 to 64, and 5.6% who were 65 years of age or older. The median age was 34 years. For every 100 females, there were 93.7 males. For every 100 females age 18 and over, there were 91.3 males.

The median income for a household in the town was $52,857, and the median income for a family was $60,125. Males had a median income of $39,167 versus $26,667 for females. The per capita income for the town was $18,012. About 5.2% of families and 5.0% of the population were below the poverty line, including 6.2% of those under age 18 and 8.8% of those age 65 or over.

== Education ==
It is in the Tippecanoe School Corporation.

Battle Ground Elementary School (Grades K-3) and Battle Ground Intermediate School (Grades 4 and 5) both lie inside of the town. Students from these schools continue on to Battle Ground Middle School for 6th–8th grade. These students will continue onto 9th–12th grade at William Henry Harrison High School.

== Notable person ==
- General David M. Shoup, (1904–1983), Commandant of the Marine Corps, 1960–1963
