= Corwin, Indiana =

Corwin is the name of at least two sites in the U.S. state of Indiana:

- Corwin, Tippecanoe County, Indiana (extinct)
