= Monroe, Indiana =

Monroe is the name of several places in the U.S. state of Indiana:

- Monroe, Adams County, Indiana
- Monroe, Tippecanoe County, Indiana
- Monroe Township, Delaware County, Indiana
- Monroe County, Indiana
- Monroe City, Indiana, a town in Knox County
