= Concord, Tippecanoe County, Indiana =

Concord
- Unincorporated community
- Tippecanoe County's location in Indiana

- Location in Tippecanoe County
- Coordinates: 40°17′36″N 86°50′15″W
- Country: United States
- State: Indiana
- County: Tippecanoe
- Township: Lauramie
- Elevation: 732 ft (223 m)
- Time zone: UTC-5 (Eastern (EST))
  - Summer (DST): UTC-4 (EDT)
- ZIP code: 47909
- Area code: 765
- GNIS feature ID: 432847

Concord is a small unincorporated community in Lauramie Township, Tippecanoe County, Indiana, located just west of Stockwell.

The community is part of the Lafayette, Indiana Metropolitan Statistical Area.

== History ==
A post office was established at Concord in 1837, and remained in operation until it was discontinued in 1868.

== Geography ==
Concord is located in Lauramie Township around the intersection of county roads 350 East and 900 South, about four miles south of Lafayette. Wea Creek is along the west side of Concord, and the creek's east branch is along the south; the two meet just west of town and flow generally northwest to the Wabash.

County Road S. 350 East is also known as Concord Road, which is the street it becomes upon entering Lafayette.
