= Beeville, Indiana =

- Ghost town
- Tippecanoe County's location in Indiana

- Location in Tippecanoe County
- Coordinates: 40°13′18″N 86°47′24″W
- Country: United States
- State: Indiana
- County: Tippecanoe
- Township: Lauramie
- Time zone: UTC-5 (Eastern (EST))
  - Summer (DST): UTC-4 (EDT)
- ZIP code: 47930
- Area code: 765

Beeville is a ghost town in Lauramie Township, near the southern border of Tippecanoe County in the U.S. state of Indiana.

== History ==
Beeville was platted in 1884 along the Toledo, St. Louis and Western Railroad and consisted of at least 10 lots. Though it gained some inhabitants, the town never saw much growth, and little to no trace of it remains today.

== Geography ==
Beeville is located at 40°13'18" North, 86°47'24" West (40.22157, -86.79009) on County Road 600 East at an elevation of approximately 796 feet. It sits in Lauramie Township along the grade of the abandoned railroad.
