= Tornado outbreak of November 17, 2013 =

Natural disaster

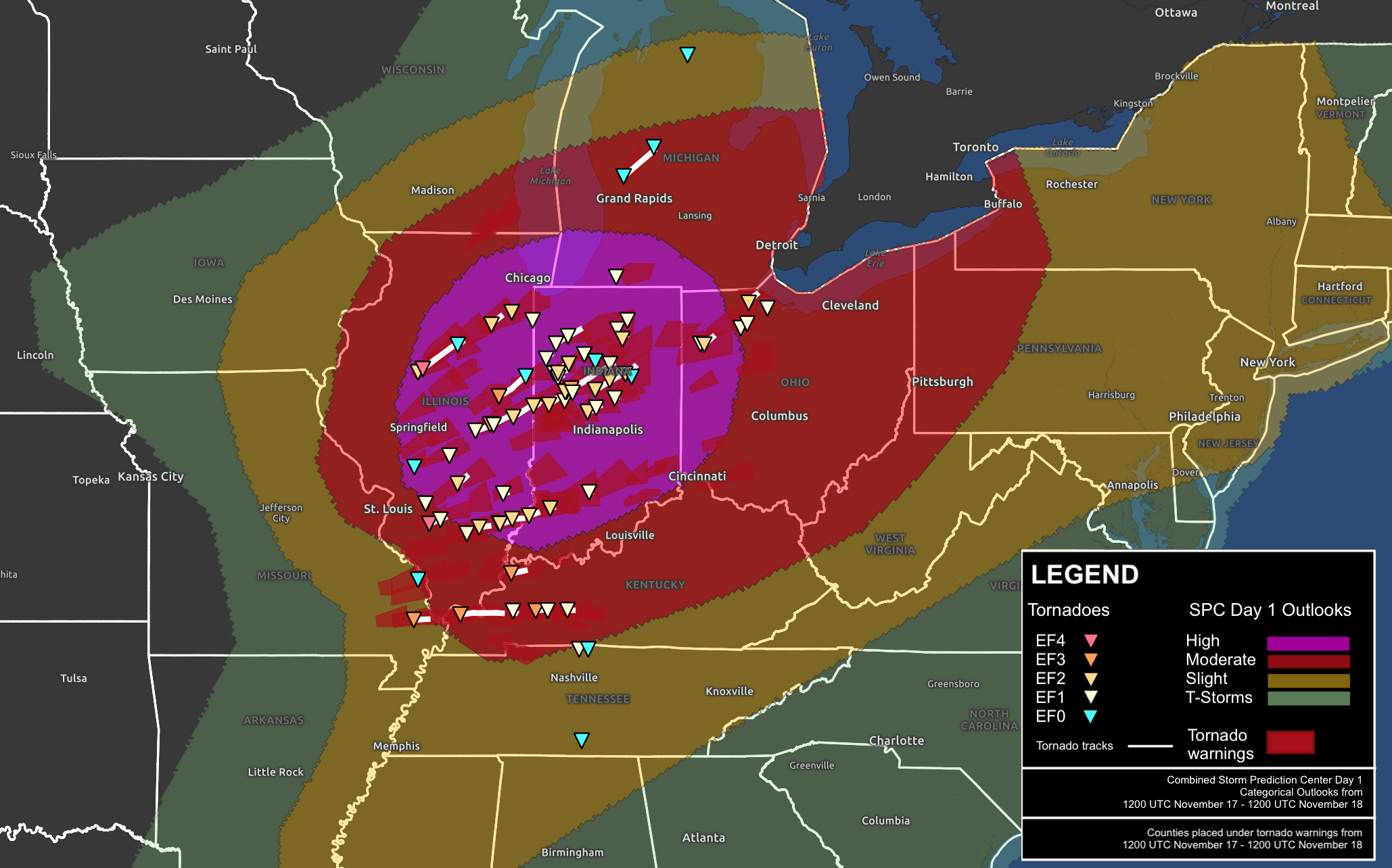
- Map of tornado warnings and confirmed tornadoes from the outbreak

Meteorological history
- Duration: November 17, 2013

Tornado outbreak
- Tornadoes: 77
- Max. rating: EF4 tornado
- Duration: 10 hours, 48 minutes
- Highest winds: Tornadic – 190 mph (310 km/h) (Washington, Illinois EF4)
- Highest gusts: Non-tornadic – 100 mph (160 km/h) near Crown Point and Swayzee, Indiana
- Largest hail: 4.00 in (10.2 cm) in diameter in Bloomington, Illinois

Extratropical cyclone
- Lowest pressure: 965 hPa (mbar); 28.50 inHg
- Max. rainfall: 4.1 inches (10 cm) in southeastern Indiana

Overall effects
- Fatalities: 8 fatalities (+3 non-tornadic)
- Injuries: 190+ injuries (+2 indirect)
- Damage: $1.6 billion (2013 USD)
- Areas affected: Midwest United States
- Power outages: 676,400
- Part of the tornado outbreaks of 2013

On November 17, 2013, the deadliest and costliest November tornado outbreak in Illinois history took shape, becoming the fourth-largest for the state overall. With more than 30 tornadoes in Indiana, it was that state's largest tornado outbreak for the month of November, and the second largest outbreak recorded in Indiana. Associated with a strong trough in the upper levels of the atmosphere, the event resulted in 77 tornadoes tracking across regions of the Midwest United States and Ohio River Valley, impacting seven states. Severe weather during the tornado outbreak caused over 100 injuries and eleven fatalities, of which eight were tornado related. Two tornadoes—both in Illinois and rated EF4 on the Enhanced Fujita scale—were the strongest documented during the outbreak and combined for five deaths. In addition to tornadoes, the system associated with the outbreak produced sizeable hail peaking at 4.00 in (10.2 cm) in diameter in Bloomington, Illinois, as well as damaging winds estimated as strong as 100 mph (160 km/h) in three locations.

The development and progression of a severe weather event on November 17 had been well anticipated, and appeared in Storm Prediction Center products as early as November 12. The first storms associated with the event formed during the afternoon and evening of November 16 over the Great Plains, primarily producing hail and strong winds. However, tornadic activity was limited to November 17, as individual supercell thunderstorms tracked across the Midwest United States, at times producing long-tracked tornadoes. The first tornadoes formed over Illinois, while the final tornadoes developed over Tennessee. Towards the end of November 17, these individual systems had merged into an extensive squall line that tracked eastward across the Mid-Atlantic states, producing damaging wind before exiting into the Atlantic Ocean early on November 18.

With damage estimated at $1.6 billion, the tornado outbreak became the seventh weather event and fifth tornado outbreak in the U.S. to accrue over $1 billion in damage that year. Tornadoes alone were responsible for $1.067 billion in damage, with the EF4 tornado that struck Washington, Illinois accounting for $935 million of the total. In addition to structural damage, widespread power outages affected thousands of electricity customers across the same regions impacted by the tornado outbreak and subsequent squall line. Non-tornadic deaths and injured include one killed in Jackson County, Michigan, when a tree fell on a car, one killed by live wires in Shiawassee County, Michigan, one killed after touching a downed wire in Detroit, and two minor injuries in a home damaged by wind in Ohio.

== Meteorological synopsis and forecasts ==
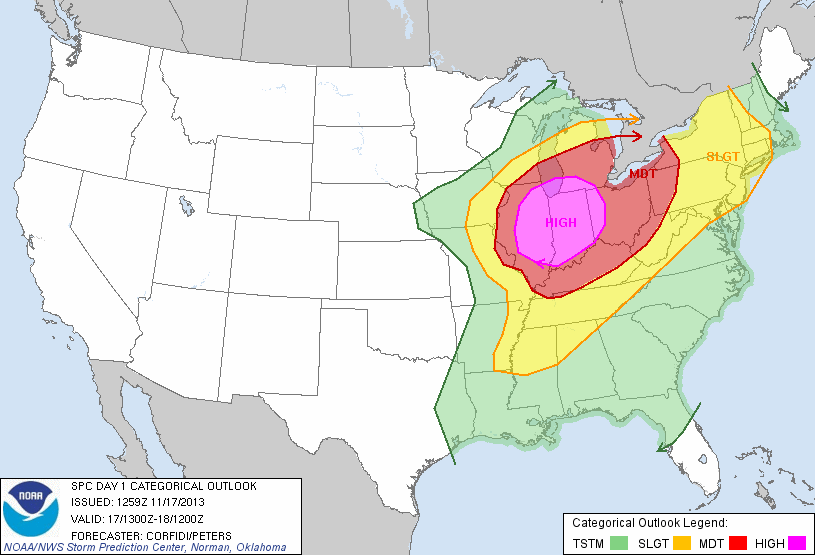
Storm Prediction Center Day 1 Outlook on November 17

Based on computer models, the Storm Prediction Center (SPC) began to assess the possibility of a widespread severe weather event for November 17 as early as November 12, though too much uncertainty existed at the time to delineate the probability and scale of the event. As models gained a better consensus, the SPC later anticipated substantial increase in atmospheric instability along the periphery of a potential cold front, indicating the risk of damaging wind gusts and tornadoes. Additional confidence over the next 24 hours resulted in a substantial expanding of this risk area into the lower Great Lakes on November 14, valid for Day 4. The overlap of increasing moisture in the atmosphere, wind shear, and high levels of CAPE were expected to contribute to the potential severe weather. The development supercells and later squall lines was anticipated, and was also expected to impact the Mid-Atlantic states. At around midday on November 15, the SPC issued a slight risk for severe weather for the 16th in regions concentrated primarily around Iowa and Missouri, forecasting the possibility of storms particularly during the evening to overnight hours of November 16. The system associated with those storms was to track eastward and strengthen, and as a result the SPC also issued a Day 3 slight risk earlier on November 15 for a large swath of the Eastern United States in effect for November 17. The slight risk included a 30% chance of severe thunderstorm activity was forecast for an area concentrated on Indiana and Ohio.

On November 16 at around 0700 UTC, the SPC upgraded their maximum convective outlook for the following day to a "moderate" for areas of the Ohio River Valley and the Great Lakes region on the basis of destabilizing atmospheric conditions, favorable wind shear, and an approaching shortwave trough. The outlook was maintained for the 1730 UTC Day 2 update on November 16, but was also expanded to the west and a mention of the risk for strong tornadoes was added to the discussion. Isolated storms began to form during the afternoon of November 16 as the overall weather system swept across the West North Central region and into the East North Central region of the United States. With development assisted by a dry line, the storms did not produce any tornadoes, but caused strong winds in hail as large as softballs in northeastern Kansas. The threat of additional severe activity that day was mitigated by cooling surface temperatures and marginal moisture and instability in the lower atmosphere. By the end of the day, convection had moved closer to the Mississippi River, with the focus of intensifying storm activity shifting southeastwards to areas in and around the Ozark Plateau.

=== November 17 ===
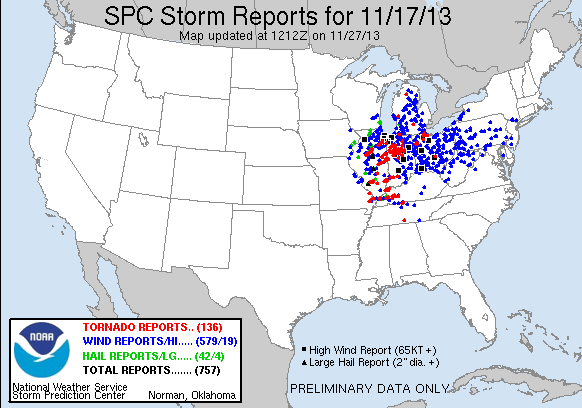
SPC storm reports for November 17, showing the extent of the tornado outbreak and subsequent wind event

With the overall upper-level system expected to track eastward across the United States High Plains on November 17, the SPC issued a slight risk for severe thunderstorm activity for an area surrounding the confluence of the Mississippi and Missouri rivers, valid for the early morning of November 17. Model data indicated the weakening of the capping inversion coinciding with increasing instability and wind shear, which would lead to the enhanced potential for storms and tornadoes as the night progressed and the low-level jet strengthened. This overnight severe weather largely failed to develop, leading to only a very few isolated reports. However, at 0600 UTC on November 17, the SPC upgraded to a high risk for severe weather on the 17th (the second latest date in the year a high risk has been issued since 2000, and the latest in the Midwest) for regions of Illinois, Indiana, southwestern Michigan, and western Ohio, in anticipation of conditions becoming increasingly favorable for a significant tornado outbreak; this area of high risk was expanded at 1300 UTC to encompass a roughly circular region of the United States Midwest containing nearly 19 million people. Those same regions were listed as having at least a 30% chance of tornadoes, coupled with a 45% chance for wind. The issuance of a high-risk zone reflected the anticipation of an intense upper-level trough and a strong mid-level jet stream producing highly conducive conditions for the development and prolonging of severe weather.

The first signs of convection associated with the broad weather system began to form around dawn on November 17 over portions of Illinois, Iowa, and Missouri, triggered by a propagating cold front. At 1440 UTC, the SPC issued a PDS tornado watch concentrated mostly around Illinois, citing the nearly certain likelihood for severe weather over the region. Throughout the morning, discrete supercell thunderstorms developed ahead of the cold front across the length of Illinois; their expected persistence eastward prompted the SPC to issue a second PDS tornado watch at 1621 UTC, this time for areas of Indiana, Michigan, and Ohio. One of these storms would maintain a mesocyclone over a 50 mi (80 km) path. The first tornado during the outbreak touched down 1652 UTC and tracked across Peoria and Tazewell counties in Illinois; the twister was later rated EF2. This was followed shortly after by a long-tracked EF4 tornado, the strongest and costliest of the day, which tracked through multiple Illinois counties.

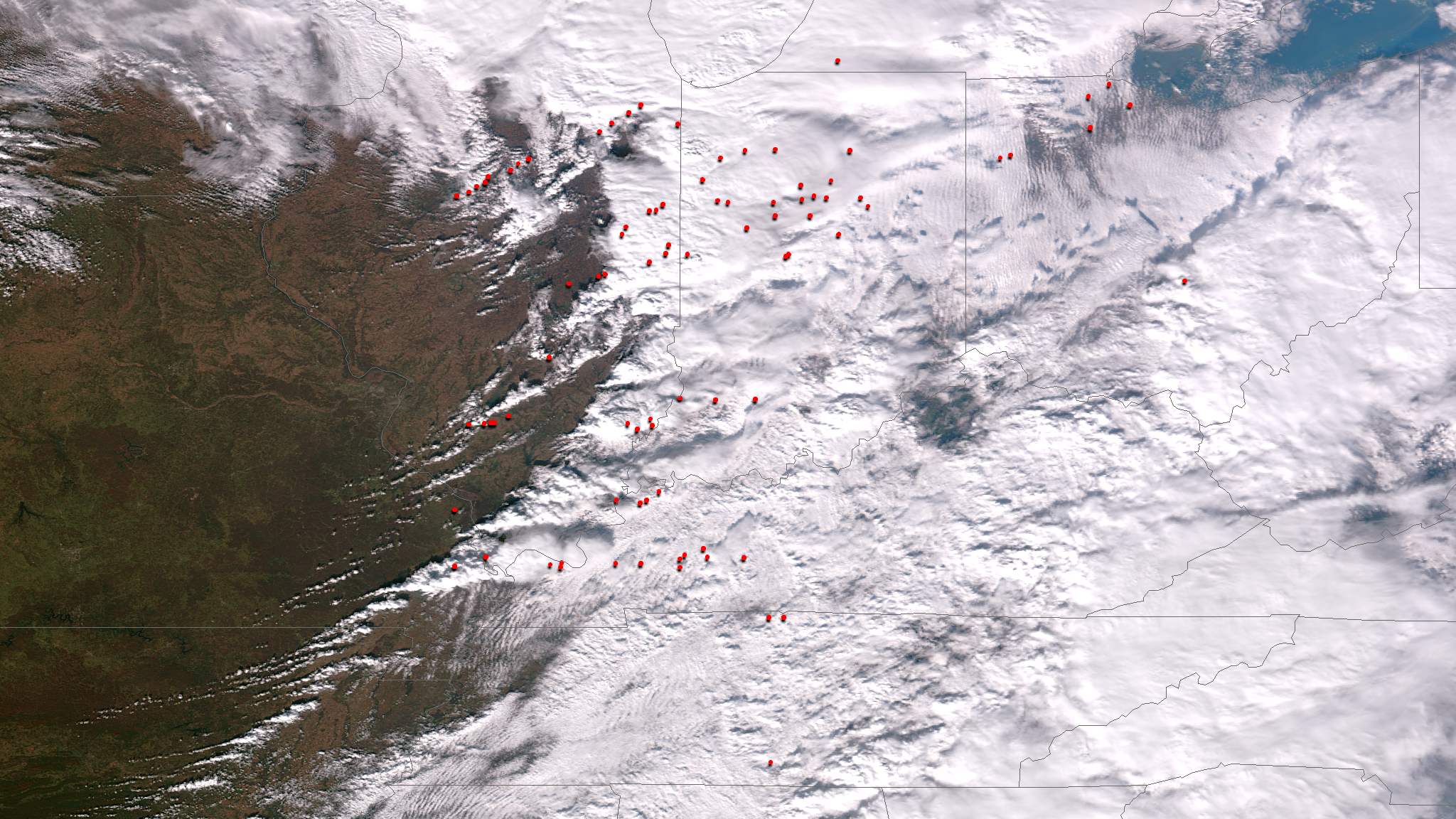
Storms associated with the outbreak over the Midwest United States on November 17

By around 1730 UTC on November 17, the system associated with the tornado outbreak had become centered near Milwaukee, Wisconsin. As intense storm cells propagated across Illinois and Indiana, strong low-level wind shear in the vicinity of a warm front coupled with the weather system made areas as far north as Northern Michigan a viable environment for tornado development. Numerous tornadoes touched down as a result of the supercells, several of which were strong to violent. In addition to spreading northward and eastward, severe thunderstorms later spread southward into the Cairo, Illinois area and later Kentucky as a result of falling barometric pressures paving the way for the spread of moisture over the area. Additional significant tornadoes occurred in that area as well. At around the same time, preexisting storms over Indiana and Illinois had begun to consolidate into a somewhat disorganized albeit extensive squall line. As a result of the merging, the threat of tornadoes generally decreased slowly as the storms moved from Indiana into Ohio while the development of a major wind event seemed more apparent, particularly in Ohio. Despite the change in storm mode, additional strong tornadoes still occurred as far east as Western Ohio due to circulations embedded in the squall line. This trend in severe weather also took place in other areas as clusters of isolated supercells began to coalesce into singular lines of storms.

By the 0100 UTC update of the convective outlook on November 18, storms had cleared the high risk area from the previous outlooks. However, a moderate risk for severe weather was maintained across parts of central/eastern Ohio, western Pennsylvania, and western New York ahead of the rapidly moving convective system. In addition to a 45% probability of wind, up to a 10% probability of tornadoes was maintained, with the highest threat in central/eastern Ohio, although owing to extremely marginal surfaced based instability, only one or two further isolated tornadoes were reported in this area beyond 0100 UTC. By the late evening, most of the discrete storms that existed earlier in the day had merged into squall lines and bow echoes, with any remaining mesocyclones embedded within these bands rather than individual storms. Forced along the extent of a cold front, the primary squall line raced eastward across Ohio at approximately 60 mph (97 km/h), reaching Pennsylvania by 0200 UTC. As a result of decreased atmospheric instability, the threat for tornadoes and hail had greatly diminished by this time, while the probability for damaging winds remained elevated to high; as a result, watches issued east of Ohio were severe thunderstorm watches rather than tornado watches. The final tornado associated with the outbreak was an EF0 that dissipated at 0340 UTC in Lincoln County, Tennessee (south of the area impacted by the main outbreak of tornadoes); based on Central Standard Time, this would have still occurred on November 17. By around 0800 UTC, the line of storms was quickly approaching the United States East Coast before entering the Atlantic Ocean.

== Confirmed tornadoes ==
Confirmed tornadoes by Enhanced Fujita rating
EFU	EF0	EF1	EF2	EF3	EF4	EF5	Total
0	14	30	24	7	2	0	77

=== Washington, Illinois ===
Washington, Illinois
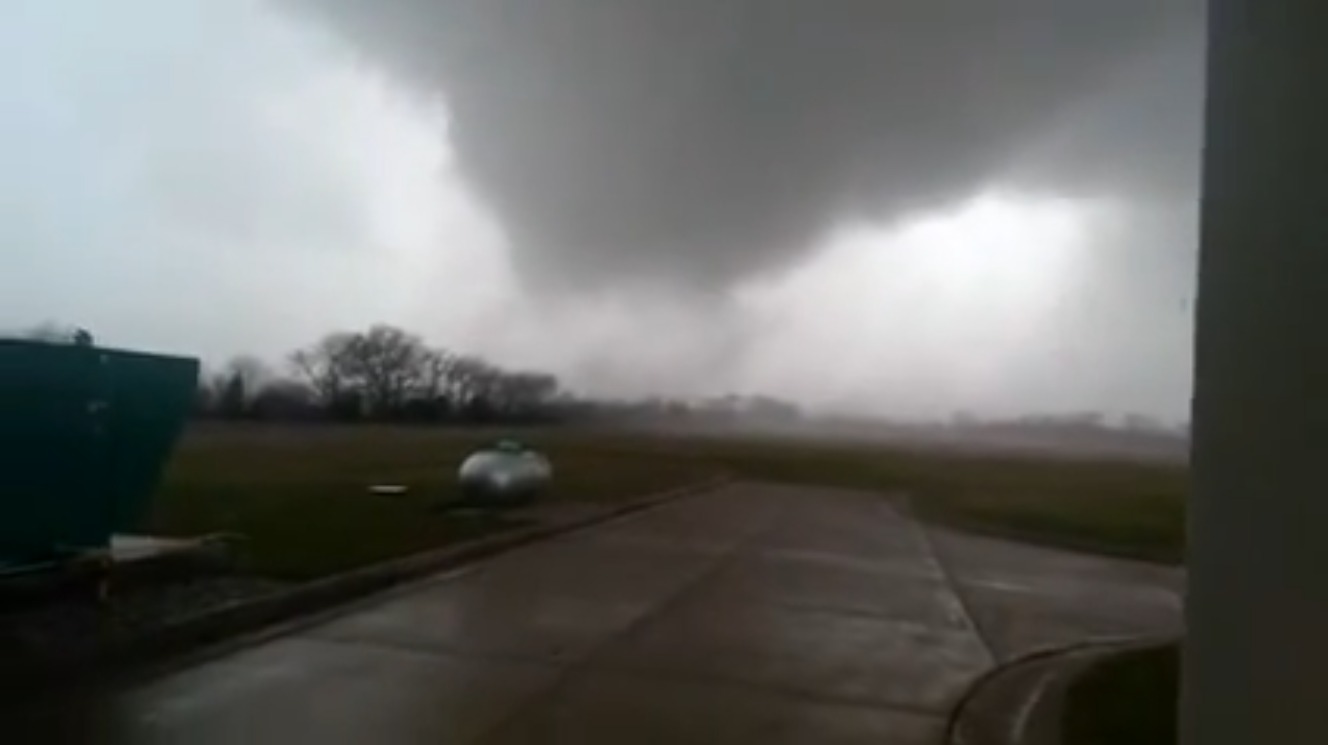
- The tornado shortly after formation

Meteorological history
- Formed: November 17, 2013, 10:59 a.m. CST (UTC−05:00)
- Dissipated: November 17, 2013, 11:47 a.m. CST (UTC−05:00)
- Duration: 48 minutes

EF4 tornado
- on the Enhanced Fujita scale
- Highest winds: 190 mph (310 km/h)

Overall effects
- Casualties: 3 fatalities, 125 injuries
- Damage: $935 million (2013 USD)

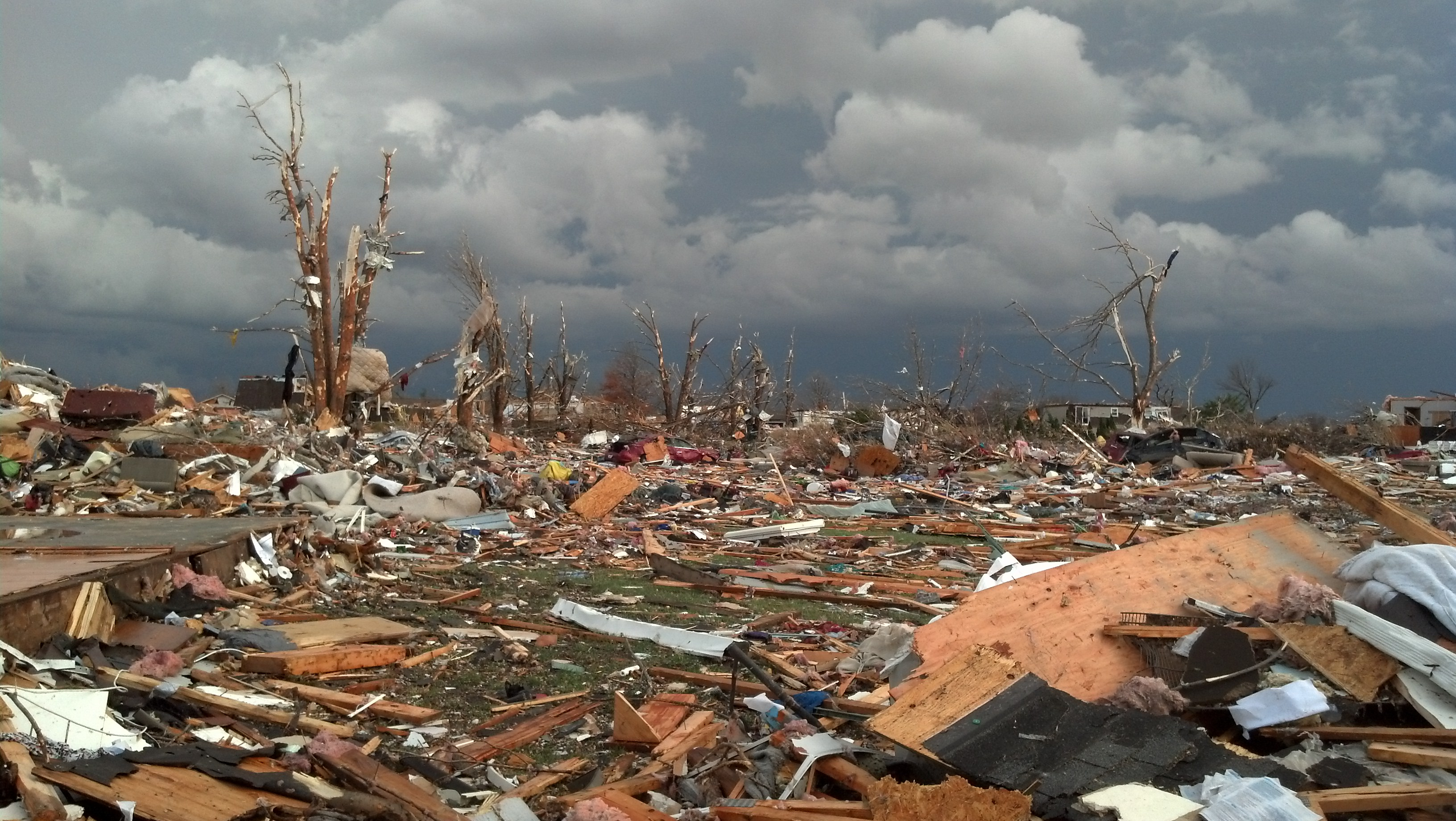
A neighborhood in Washington destroyed by the EF4 tornado.

Tracking 46.36 mi (74.61 km) across four counties in Illinois, this devastating EF4 tornado caused major damage in Washington, Illinois, it was the strongest tornado documented in the state for the month of November since reliable records began in 1950. Up until that point, two other tornadoes in 1988 and 1991 were the strongest for that month. The first tornado warning on the storm cell that produced the tornado was issued at 16:50 UTC for portions of Peoria, Tazewell, and Woodford counties, nine minutes before the tornado was estimated to have touched down. By the time the tornado had developed, the tornado warning was still in effect for those areas, and at 17:06 UTC, the Particularly Dangerous Situation wording was included into the tornado warning text. Several tornado warnings were issued as the tornado tracked towards the northeast, with the final warning expiring at 1818 UTC, well after the tornado dissipated.

The tornado initially touched down at 16:59 UTC roughly 2.4 mi (3.9 km) southeast of East Peoria in Tazewell County before moving directly into town. Damage was considerable in East Peoria, where the tornado accrued $110 million in damage costs. Thousands of trees and power poles were destroyed, along with 20 houses. Major damage was sustained by 75 houses, seven businesses, and five apartment buildings, while 137 other houses and three other businesses sustained minor damage. Over 400 vehicles were damaged in East Peoria. The tornado then strengthened and broadened to its peak intensity as a high-end EF4 with winds estimated at 190 mph (310 km/h) and a damage width extending 0.5 mi (0.80 km) in diameter as it moved into the nearby town of Washington. A debris ball was detected on weather radar in association with the tornado as it moved over the city. Entire neighborhoods in Washington were leveled, and some homes were swept clean from their foundations. The Georgetown Common Apartments were severely damaged, and a pickup truck in the parking lot was found wrapped around a tree. Trees in Washington were denuded and partially debarked, vehicles were thrown, and an auto parts store was completely leveled. A total of 633 homes, seven more businesses and apartment buildings, and 2,500 vehicles were destroyed in Washington, while minor to significant damage was sustained by numerous other structures. Though 5,000 people were in the path of the tornado, only one person was killed during the storm's initial passage, while two others died of injuries sustained during the tornado in the days following November 17. The low fatality count was attributed to people successfully seeking shelter. Damage costs in Washington amounted to $800 million. Alongside the three fatalities were 121 injuries throughout Tazewell County.

The tornado then moved into Woodford County, where it maintained its size but slightly weakened to EF3 intensity as it passed near the towns of Roanoke, Benson, and Minonk. The tornado passed very close to the Parsons manufacturing plant that was destroyed in the 2004 Roanoke tornado. Despite tracking mostly across open fields, 70 farm buildings and seven homes were destroyed, with major damage sustained to 17 more. One unanchored farmhouse near Benson was swept away at EF3 intensity, and a car parked in the driveway was thrown into the basement. Roughly 100 vehicles were damaged, including several semis at a truck stop located north of Minonk, where three people were injured. Hundreds of power lines and trees were snapped, and a cell tower collapsed. Damage in Woodford County totaled $25 million. The EF3 tornado weakened further to EF2 status as it briefly tracked over LaSalle County, where damage totaled $150,000. Numerous power poles were snapped in this area, and two homes sustained significant damage. Various small outbuildings and a machine shed were also destroyed. Similar damage occurred in Livingston County, where in addition to outbuilding and power pole damage, an extensive swath of trees was sheared off, and a fire engine that was being stored in a garage was blown over as the structure was destroyed. The tornado finally dissipated 2 mi (3.2 km) east-northeast of Long Point at 17:47 UTC, after remaining on the ground for 48 minutes. In total, the tornado caused three fatalities and 125 injuries in two counties and $935 million in damage across four counties. This made it the 10th costliest tornado in United States history. This was the first violent tornado in Illinois in November, but Illinois has seen violent tornadoes in December.

=== New Minden, Illinois ===
New Minden, Illinois
- The tornado as seen from Hoyleton.

Meteorological history
- Formed: November 17, 2013, 12:04 p.m. CST (UTC−05:00)
- Dissipated: November 17, 2013, 12:13 p.m. CST (UTC−05:00)
- Duration: 9 minutes

EF4 tornado
- on the Enhanced Fujita scale
- Highest winds: 180 mph (290 km/h)

Overall effects
- Casualties: 2 fatalities, 2 injuries

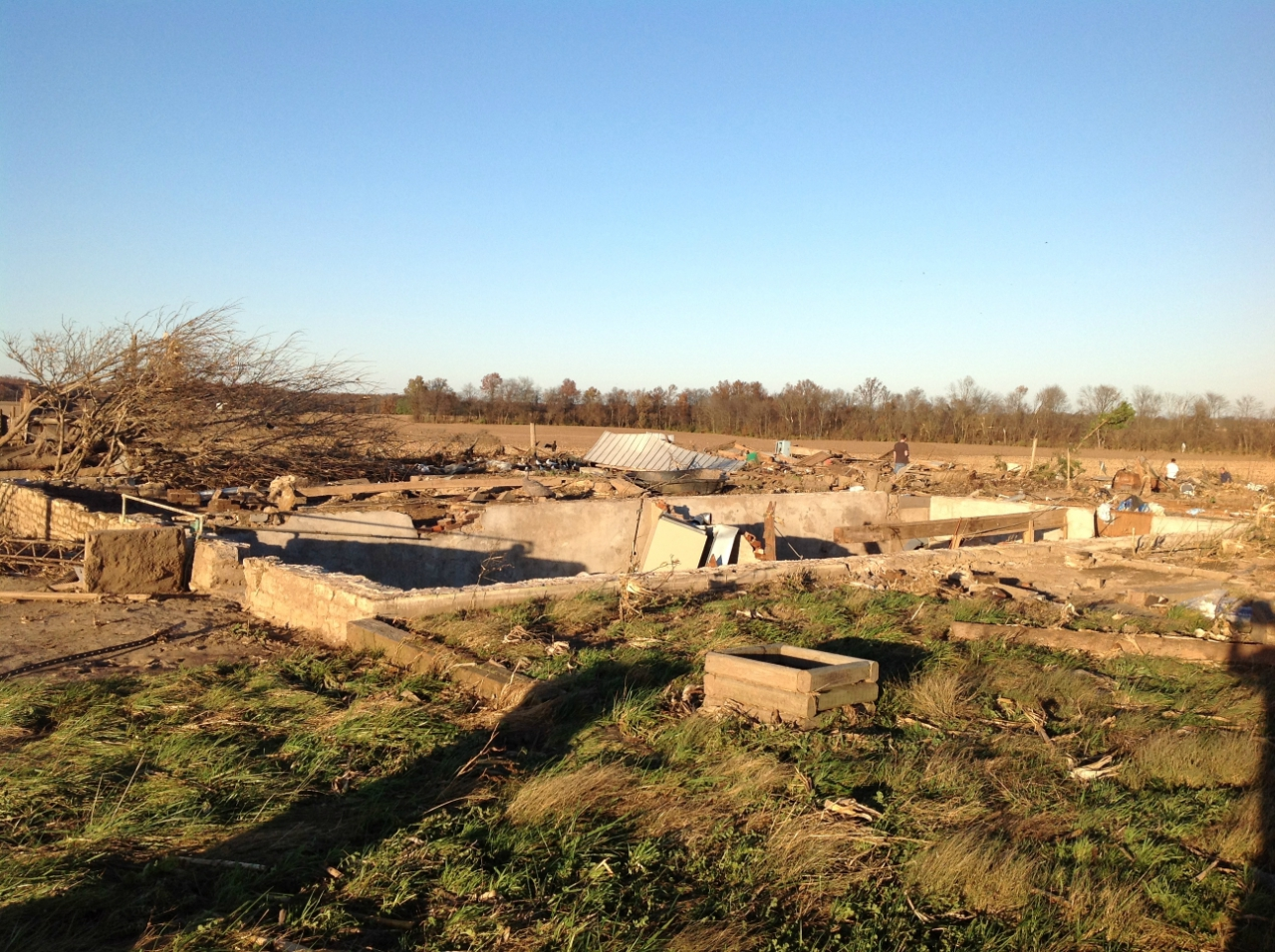
EF4 damage to a home near New Minden

At around noon on November 17, this EF4 tornado tracked across portions of Washington County, Illinois and resulted in the deaths of two people, becoming the second tornado that day to cause fatalities. The St. Louis, Missouri Weather Forecast Office first issued a tornado warning for areas of Clinton County and northern Washington County, Illinois at 1753 UTC, due to the tornadic threat of a rapidly moving severe thunderstorm in the region. A tornado was estimated to have touched down 4.4 mi (7.1 km) southwest of New Minden near I-64 at 18:04 UTC, 11 minutes after the issuance of the initial tornado warning. A semi-trailer truck was blown off of the highway near this point, injuring the driver. Just past the interstate, a farm home sustained EF1 damage and a man sustained minor cuts at that location. A nearby hay barn was destroyed at EF2 intensity. The tornado rapidly intensified as it tracked northeastward, striking a small farm at mid-range EF4 intensity with maximum winds estimated to have been 180 mph (290 km/h). The homestead there was completely swept away with little debris left behind, and other buildings on the farm grounds sustained various degrees of damage. Several vehicles on the property were rolled as well. An elderly couple were killed in the house as it was swept from its foundation.

By 18:07 UTC, the tornado continued through rural areas towards New Minden at EF2 strength, snapping power poles, destroying outbuildings, and removing much of the roof from a site-built home and a garage. A truck was overturned as well. The tornado then struck the north side of New Minden directly, inflicting significant damage to a church and several homes, two of which sustained EF3 damage with total roof loss and collapse of exterior walls. East of New Minden, a farm sustained EF2 damage, where outbuildings were completely destroyed and the farmhouse was shifted from its foundation. Trees were snapped and a grain bin was destroyed in this area as well. Moderate damage continued as the tornado crossed through rural areas northwest of Hoyleton. A mobile home 2 mi (3.2 km) north of Hoyleton was completely destroyed at EF2 intensity and a nearby outbuilding was damaged before the tornado dissipated at 18:13 UTC, 2.6 mi (4.2 km) north-northeast of Hoyleton. In total, the twister, which peaked at EF4 intensity, lasted for nine minutes and tracked across 10.59 mi (17.04 km). Though initial damage surveys suggested a much longer damage path associated with one tornado, the damage was later reassessed to indicate the existence of two separate albeit consecutive tornadoes, with the EF4 tornado followed by an EF1 tornado that lasted for five minutes and had a path 4.76 mi (7.66 km) long. The tornado warning for Washington and Clinton counties expired at 1830 UTC, after both tornadoes dissipated.

=== Paducah, Kentucky/Brookport–Shady Grove–Unionville, Illinois ===
Paducah, Kentucky/Brookport–Shady Grove–Unionville, Illinois
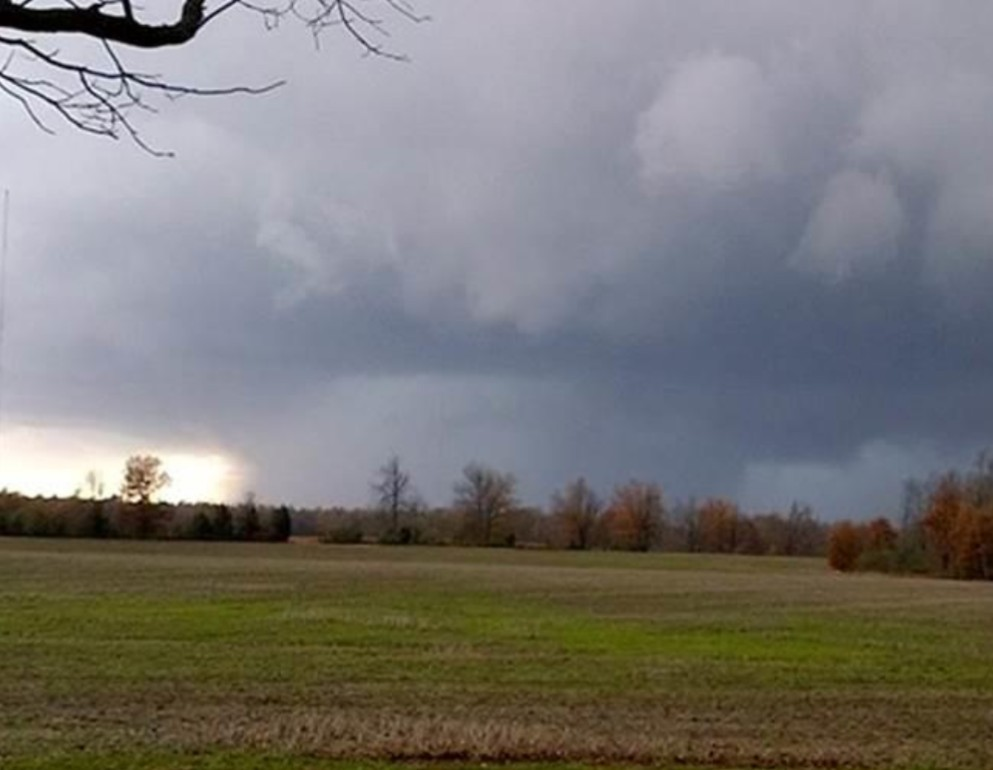
- The rain-wrapped tornado seen approaching Paducah.

Meteorological history
- Formed: November 17, 2013, 2:05 p.m. CST (UTC−05:00)
- Dissipated: November 17, 2013, 2:56 p.m. CST (UTC−05:00)
- Duration: 51 minutes

EF3 tornado
- on the Enhanced Fujita scale
- Highest winds: 145 mph (233 km/h)

Overall effects
- Casualties: 3 fatalities, 33 injuries
- Damage: $5.5 million

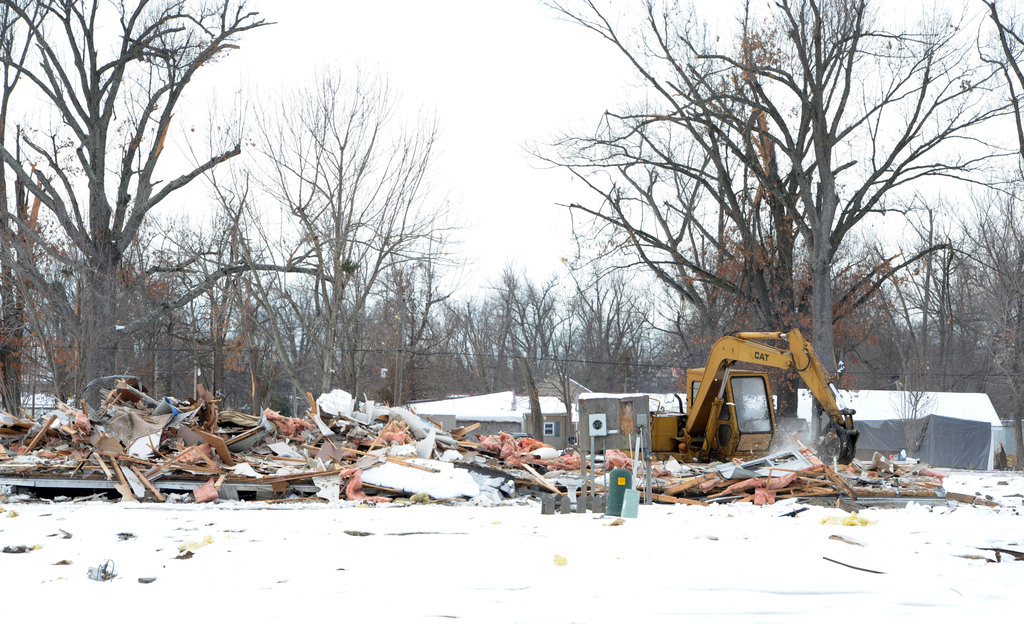
Snow that fell in Brookport in the days following the tornado interfered with debris cleanup.

This long-tracked, heavily rain-wrapped and destructive EF3 tornado that moved along the Ohio River through parts of Kentucky and Illinois and devastated the small town of Brookport, along with nearby rural communities, becoming the final killer tornado of the outbreak.

The tornado initially touched down just inside western McCracken County, Kentucky northeast of Kevil and moved across the northern fringes of Paducah. The tornado was at EF2 strength in McCracken County, demolishing an abandoned mobile home, causing roof and siding damage to many structures (most of them being homes), destroying the foyer of a church, bending road signs, ripping a wooden fence out of the ground, and blowing over chain-link fences. At one building, three metal roll-up doors were blown in and part of a wall was blown out. The tops of three steel power transmission towers were bent over, power lines were downed, train car covers were blown off, and a sports utility vehicle was blown 30 yards (27 m) into a ditch as well. Some damage to buildings and cooling towers at the Paducah Gaseous Diffusion Plant was noted, though no hazardous materials were released. The tornado crossed the Ohio River into Massac County, Illinois where it went through Brookport at low-end EF3 strength and completely destroyed dozens of mobile homes, many of which were blown over 100 feet (30 m). Also in Brookport, a frail site-built home was leveled, and dozens of homes, garages, storage buildings, and businesses sustained structural damage. Hundreds of trees were downed and cars were tossed as well. The tornado caused some minor damage to guard rails on the Ohio River bridge that carries traffic from Paducah to Brookport on U.S. Highway 45. East of Brookport, the tornado maintained EF3 strength as it impacted the small rural community of Shady Grove. Mobile homes in Shady Grove were obliterated, with their frames wrapped around trees. An empty school bus was picked up and thrown, and a two-story home was pushed off of its foundation and had many of its first floor walls ripped off, along with its porch. Past Shady Grove, the tornado struck the neighboring community of Unionville, where additional low-end EF3 damage occurred. Many trees in Unionville were snapped, and a large double-wide mobile home was obliterated and swept away, with debris scattered 500 feet. The home's heavy 7-by-12-foot concrete porch slab was lifted and moved by the tornado. The tornado weakened to EF2 strength as it moved briefly through Pope County and then back across the Ohio River into Livingston County, Kentucky, destroying several mobile homes and barns in this area and snapping numerous trees. In Lyon County the tornado downed additional trees before dissipating. Three people were killed and 33 additional people were injured along the tornado's 42 mi (68 km) long path. All fatalities occurred in mobile homes that were destroyed in Brookport. Snow that fell in the area during the days following the tornado hindered cleanup efforts.

== Non-tornadic events ==
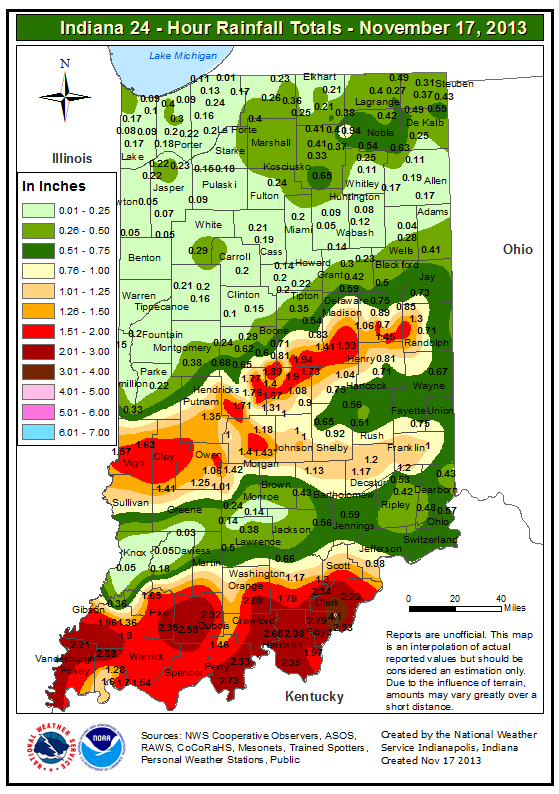
Rainfall totals in Indiana on November 17

The same system that contributed to the development of multiple tornadoes over several states also produced strong winds. On November 17, the SPC received 579 severe wind reports, of which 19 indicated winds exceeding 75 mph (121 km/h), the threshold for hurricane-force winds on the Beaufort scale. The strongest of these reported winds peaked at 100 mph (160 km/h) in three locations – Crown Point, Indiana, Swayzee, Indiana. West of Chicago in Ogle County, Illinois, six trucks were overturned on highways. High winds in Chicago led to an NFL game between the Chicago Bears and Baltimore Ravens being suspended for nearly two hours. Much of Ohio was affected by straight-line winds, which caused widespread tree damage and sparked a power outage which impacted thousands of electricity customers. FirstEnergy reported a loss of electricity to 24,000 people in northwestern Ohio, with outages spiking in Wood County. Similarly, American Electric Power and Consumers Energy reported significant power outages, with the former indicating that at one point 33,500 of their customers were without service. Outages were more widespread in Michigan, with blackouts under the purview of DTE Energy and Consumers Energy impacting 458,900 homes and businesses. Across Indiana, over 160,000 people were without power. In Kokomo, Indiana, a mall, bank, and fire station all suffered considerable damage from tornadoes, and city management declared a state of emergency for the city and closed schools on November 18 following the storms. In the National Weather Service Indianapolis coverage zone, rainfall peaked at 1.89 in (48 mm).

== Aftermath ==
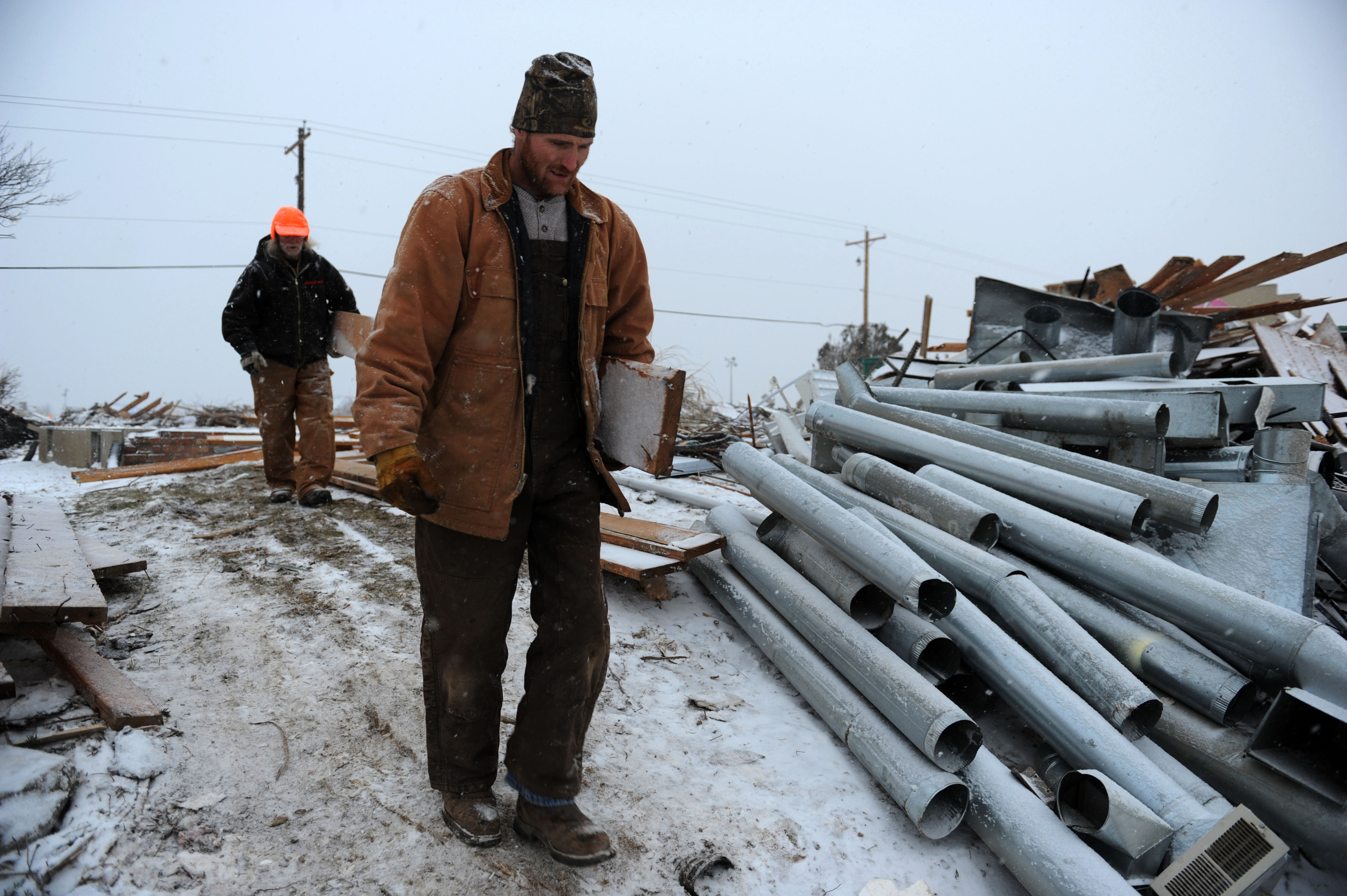
William Winchell (right) and John Heath helping the clean-up effort during snowfall

=== Response ===
State politicians including governor Pat Quinn and senators Dick Durbin and Mark Kirk visited Washington. President Barack Obama authorized disaster funding for 15 counties in Illinois, while Governor Quinn declared seven counties as disaster areas. The Illinois National Guard dispatched ten firefighters and three vehicles to assist in searching for survivors from the tornado, with reports about people being trapped under rubble. On November 23, Governor Quinn announced the opening of a Multi-Agency Resource Center in Washington so survivors affected by the tornado could have easier access to relief services from 20 state and local agencies, and the Department of Insurance helped cover insurance issues.

Ten 182nd Airlift Wing firefighters from the Illinois Air National Guard were dispatched to the city, searching through a total of 36 leveled structures, clearing debris, and shutting off six gas lines. The American Red Cross held a relief drive in Annawan to help victims from the Washington tornado, accepting cash donations and supplies like bottled water; volunteers also helped with the cleaning effort. The city of Washington was placed under a 6 p.m. curfew for a week. Army Reserve soldiers from the 724th Transportation Company, stationed at Bartonville, Illinois, came to assist after the Fire Chief of Washington requested help to set up blockades that lead into and out of the city; the soldiers set up blockades at four locations around Washington, using semi-trucks and Humvees. The team of soldiers stayed to support law enforcement until civil services arrived.

The Salvation Army donated over 20,000 supplies to communities in Central Illinois and Eastern Iowa, and over 100 people received emotional and spiritual care. Over 500 volunteers from All Hands and Hearts visited Washington, Illinois to help with debris removal despite the cold temperature from November to December 2013. Rock to the Rescue, a non-profit organization, raised more than $400,000 in a benefit concert in Bloomington for affected communities. Six days after the tornado passed, a caravan of fire trucks and ambulances from all around central Illinois waited to welcome the football team Washington Panthers, who were returning from the Illinois 5A state football semifinals. The motorcade carrying the team drove along Main Street, with dozens of residents lining up on the sideline to cheer and support the team. One week after the tornado struck, baseball player Jim Thome—a Peoria native—donated $100,000 to tornado relief for Washington.

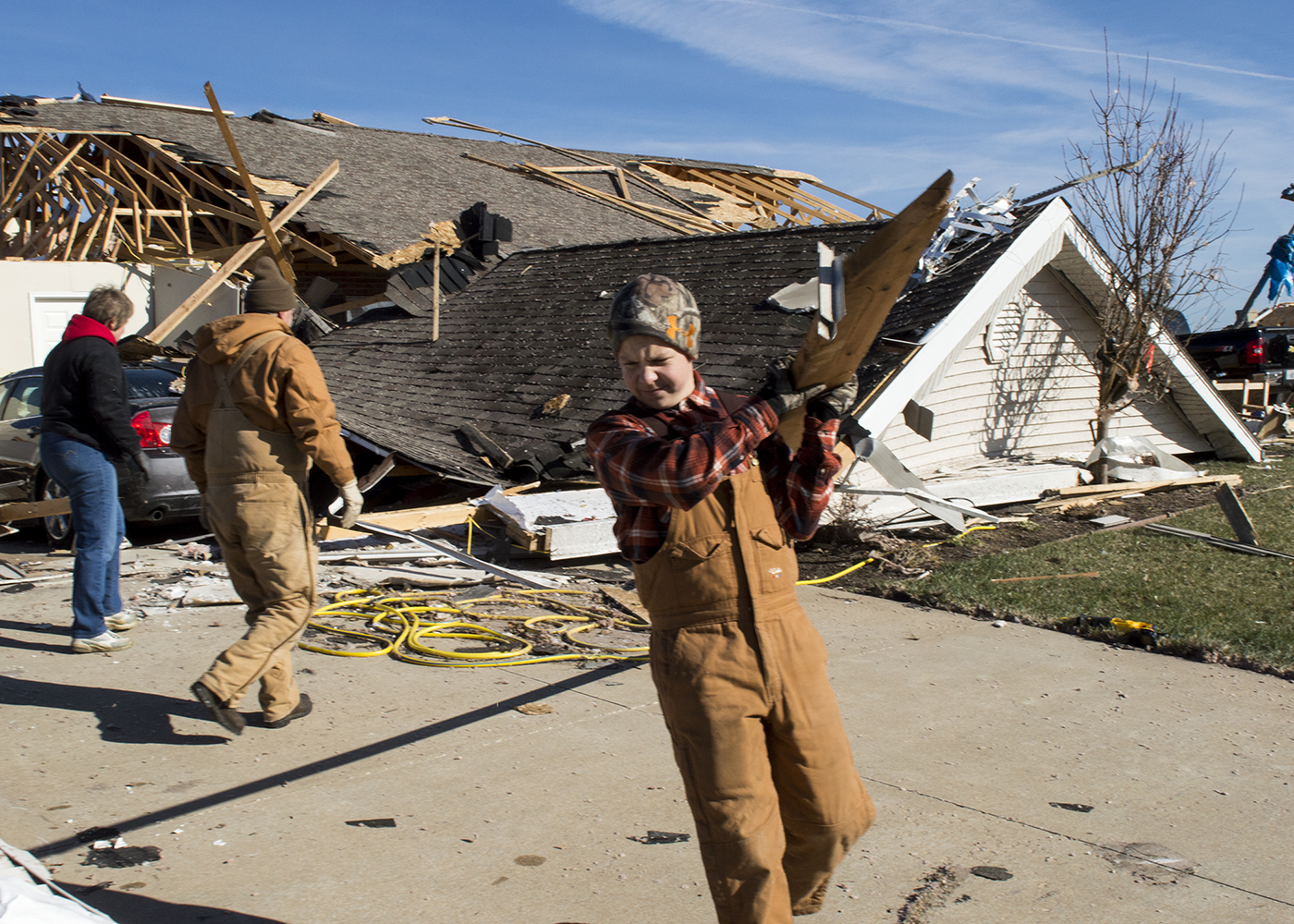
The Occupational Safety and Health Administration's Peoria Area Office in Washington, clearing debris and talking to residents on how to protect themselves from health hazards.

Operation BBQ Relief spent over six days in Washington, making over 25,600 meals for the victims of the tornado. The Washington Tornado Relief Fund, later renamed the Washington Illinois Area and the Washington Community Foundation, was created in the wake of the tornado to benefit the residents of the city through assistance to local charities and governmental entities. Samaritan's Purse dispatched a disaster relief unit onto Washington the day after the tornado, establishing a base in Morton, Illinois; two days later, a total of 854 volunteers worked on clearing debris and tarping roofs that were damaged. Peoria Brick Company offered hundreds of red Washington Strong brick free of charge to residents who lost their homes, generating $2,570 that was later donated to Washington Illinois Area Foundation tornado relief, with the bricks valued at $7,000.

=== FEMA aid refusal controversy ===
On December 19, 2013, the Illinois Emergency Management Agency requested $6.1 million in federal assistance for the local governments and electrical cooperative in the nine counties that were affected by the tornadoes of November 17. The Federal Emergency Management Agency (FEMA) responded on January 9, 2014, stating how the devastation in Washington was not "severe" enough to merit federal help. Governor Quinn and U.S. senators Dick Durbin and Mark Kirk voiced their disappointment in the decision.

On February 6, 2014, the Illinois Emergency Management Agency appealed the denial of aid, citing $21.4 million in disaster-related expenses for the local governments in the nine counties that it believed were eligible for 75% reimbursements. On March 3, 2014, FEMA denied an application from the mayor of Washington, Gary Manier, for $26 million in aid. In a press conference, Manier told reporters,

"The federal government has failed us. The FEMA system is broken. ... Downstate Illinois doesn't have a chance of getting aid from the federal government."

— Gary Manier

FEMA told Manier and other state officials that debris cleanup occurring beyond three days after the tornado would not be paid for by the federal government. FEMA also ruled that the federal government was not required to pay for damages done to infrastructure by vehicles helping to clear the street. FEMA later stated Illinois's damage assessments on the tornadoes were not qualified for any federal payment. Manier blamed federal guidelines for the calculation of damages.

On March 4, 2014, the state appealed FEMA's denial; the appeal was conclusively rejected, and less than 12 hours later, on March 5, Pat Quinn visited the city of Washington to announce a $45 million state-funded tornado relief plan for the affected communities. Federal legislators promised to fix FEMA's formula—calculating the certain amount of damage cities need to sustain before they qualify for federal aid—but almost three years after the tornado happened, nothing had changed, and during that time period, the state of Illinois had to pay the recovery costs that FEMA would otherwise have covered.

== See also ==
- List of North American tornadoes and tornado outbreaks
- Great Blue Norther of November 11, 1911
- 2002 Veterans Day Weekend tornado outbreak
- Mid-November 2005 tornado outbreak
