= Monroe, Tippecanoe County, Indiana =

Monroe
- Unincorporated community
- Tippecanoe County's location in Indiana

- Location in Tippecanoe County
- Coordinates: 40°17′11″N 086°44′07″W
- Country: United States
- State: Indiana
- County: Tippecanoe
- Township: Lauramie
- Elevation: 787 ft (240 m)
- Time zone: UTC-5 (Eastern (EST))
  - Summer (DST): UTC-4 (EDT)
- ZIP code: 47905
- Area code: 765
- GNIS feature ID: 439339

Monroe is a small unincorporated community in Lauramie Township, Tippecanoe County, in the U.S. state of Indiana. The community is part of the Lafayette, Indiana Metropolitan Statistical Area.

== History ==
A post office was established under the name Huntersville in 1836; it was renamed Monroe in 1840, and remained in operation until it was discontinued in 1853.

Monroe originally included three northwest–southeast streets (Darlington, Main, and Patterson) and three northeast–southwest streets (Fayette, Columbia, and Lauramie).

== Geography ==
Monroe stands in mostly open farmland at the intersection of US Route 52 and County Road 900 South, about 10 miles southeast of the city of Lafayette and less than two miles east of the town of Stockwell. Monroe Cemetery is on the west side of town, and Lauramie Creek flows westward just to the south.

== Gallery ==
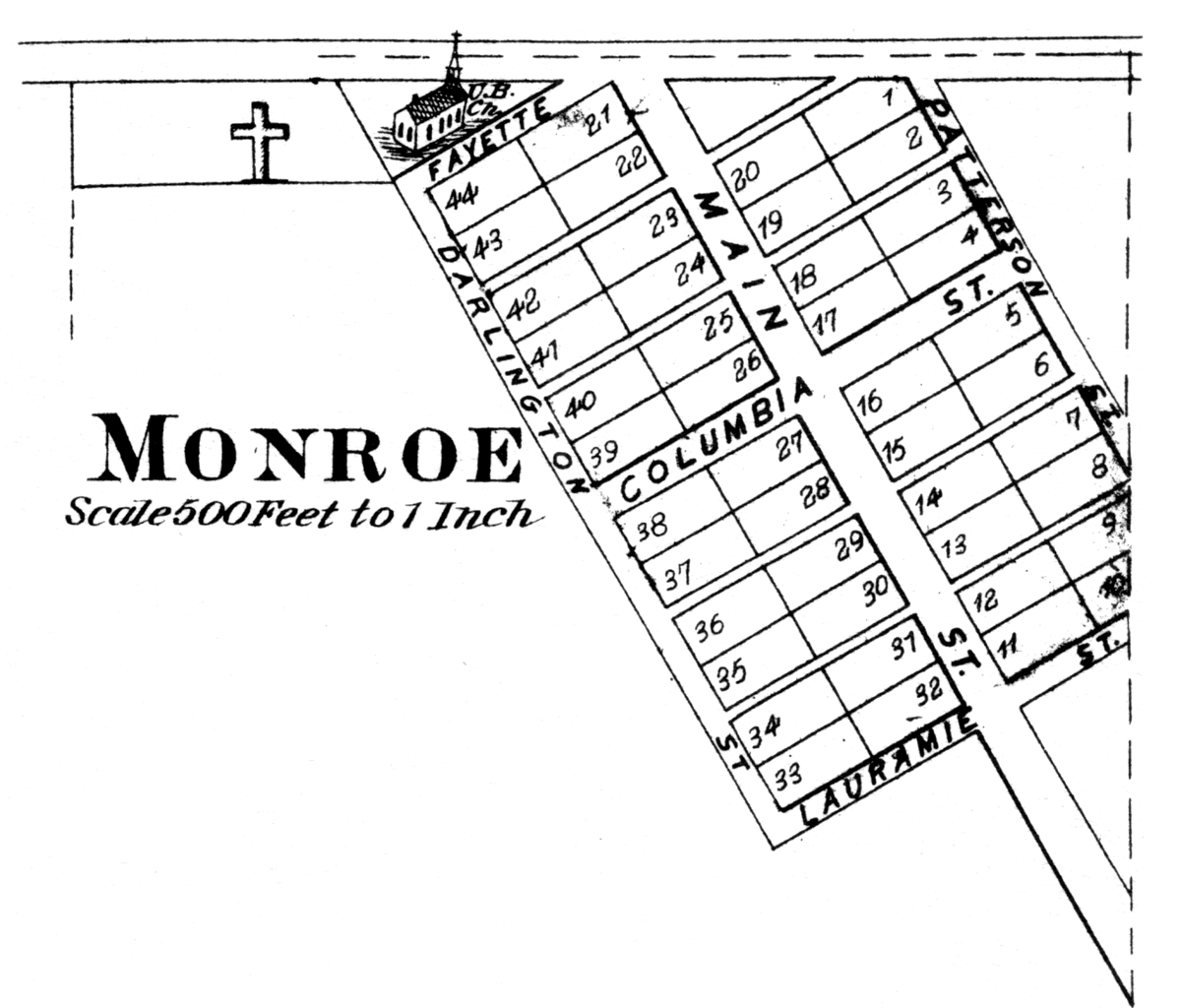
Monroe in 1878

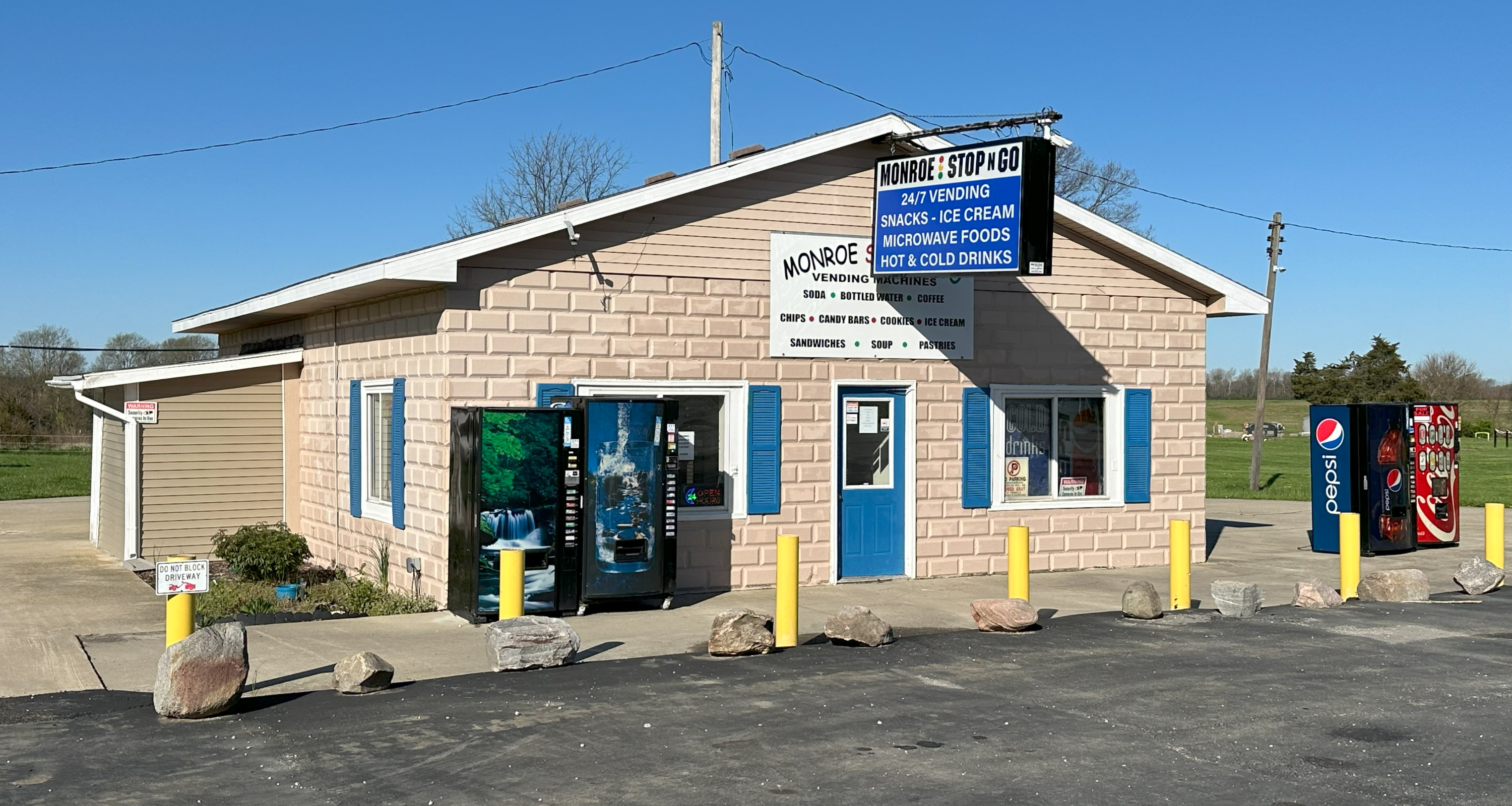
Monroe's single store

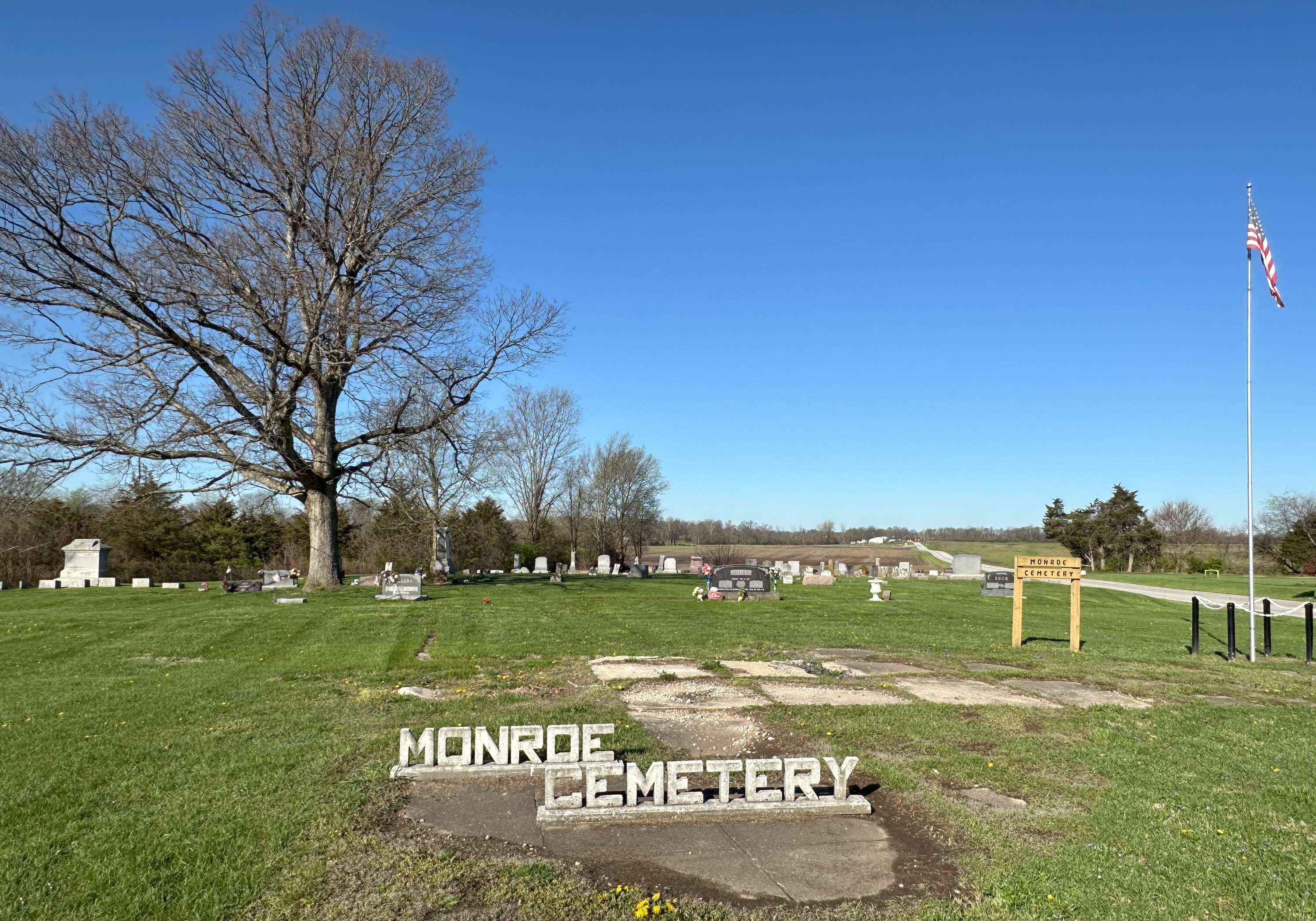
Monroe Cemetery
