= Corwin, Tippecanoe County, Indiana =

Corwin
- Ghost town
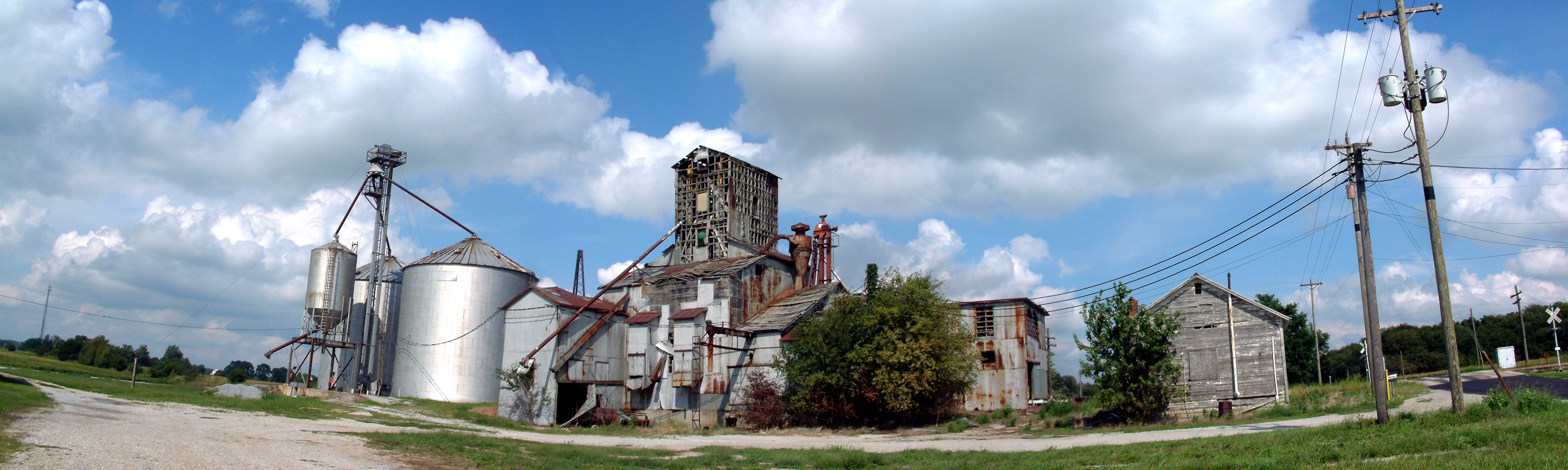
- The grain elevators at Corwin

- Tippecanoe County's location in Indiana

- Location in Tippecanoe County
- Coordinates: 40°15′5″N 86°54′52″W
- Country: United States
- State: Indiana
- County: Tippecanoe
- Township: Randolph
- Elevation: 735 ft (224 m)
- Time zone: UTC-5 (Eastern (EST))
  - Summer (DST): UTC-4 (EDT)
- ZIP code: 47981
- Area code: 765
- GNIS feature ID: 446668

Corwin was a small town, now extinct, in Randolph Township, Tippecanoe County, in the U.S. state of Indiana.

== History ==
Corwin was laid out by Cyrus Foltz in 1856 and consisted of seven lots near the rail line which ran south out of Lafayette. The town never flourished, though, and was eclipsed by nearby Romney. Later maps sometimes cite the town as Corwin Station.

A post office was established at Corwin in 1854, but was discontinued in that same year.

== Geography ==
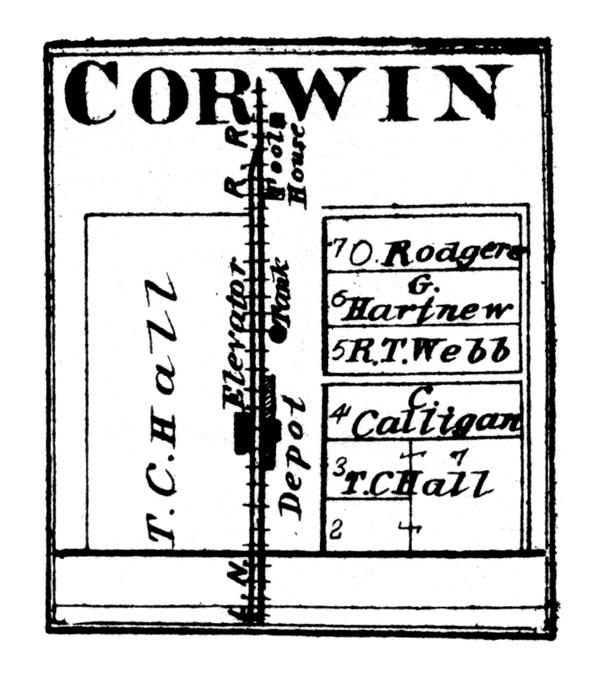
Corwin in 1878.

Corwin is located at 40°15'5" North, 86°54'52" West (40.251426, -86.914397) at an elevation of approximately 740 feet. It sits in Randolph Township half a mile west of the town of Romney and is on a north–south CSX rail line.

Even though the community is now extinct, it is still listed by the USGS.
