= Lauramie Township, Tippecanoe County, Indiana =

Lauramie Township
- Township
- Location in Tippecanoe County
- Coordinates: 40°15′03″N 86°46′59″W
- Country: United States
- State: Indiana
- County: Tippecanoe

Government
  - Type: Indiana township

Area
  - Total: 54.07 sq mi (140.0 km^{2})
  - Land: 54.05 sq mi (140.0 km^{2})
  - Water: 0.02 sq mi (0.052 km^{2}) 0.04%
- Elevation: 784 ft (239 m)

Population (2020)
  - Total: 2,544
  - Density: 48/sq mi (19/km^{2})
- Time zone: UTC-5 (Eastern (EST))
  - Summer (DST): UTC-4 (EDT)
- ZIP codes: 47905, 47909, 47930, 47981, 47983
- Area code: 765
- GNIS feature ID: 453543

Lauramie Township is one of thirteen townships in Tippecanoe County, Indiana, United States. As of the 2010 census, its population was 2,596 and it contained 1,021 housing units.

== Geography ==
According to the 2010 census, the township has a total area of 54.07 square miles (140.0 km^{2}), of which 54.05 square miles (140.0 km^{2}) (or 99.96%) is land and 0.02 square miles (0.052 km^{2}) (or 0.04%) is water.

=== Cities, towns, villages ===
- Clarks Hill

=== Unincorporated communities ===
- Concord at 40.2933697°N 86.8375069°W
- Gladens Corner at 40.2586476°N 86.8283397°W
- Monroe at 40.2864248°N 86.7352836°W
- Stockwell at 40.2861471°N 86.7708395°W

(This list is based on USGS data and may include former settlements.)

=== Extinct towns ===
- Beeville

=== Adjacent townships ===
- Sheffield Township (north)
- Madison Township, Clinton County (northeast)
- Perry Township, Clinton County (east)
- Washington Township, Clinton County (east)
- Sugar Creek Township, Montgomery County (south)
- Madison Township, Montgomery County (southwest)
- Randolph Township (west)
- Wea Township (northwest)

=== Cemeteries ===
The township contains these eight cemeteries: Clark, Concord, Fairview, Johnson, Saint Joe, Stingley, Union and Yorktown.

=== Major highways ===
- Interstate 65
- US Route 52

=== Airports and landing strips ===
- Timber House Airport

== School districts ==
- Tippecanoe School Corporation

== Political districts ==
- Indiana's 4th congressional district
- State House District 41
- State Senate District 22
