= Randolph Township, Tippecanoe County, Indiana =

Randolph Township
- Township
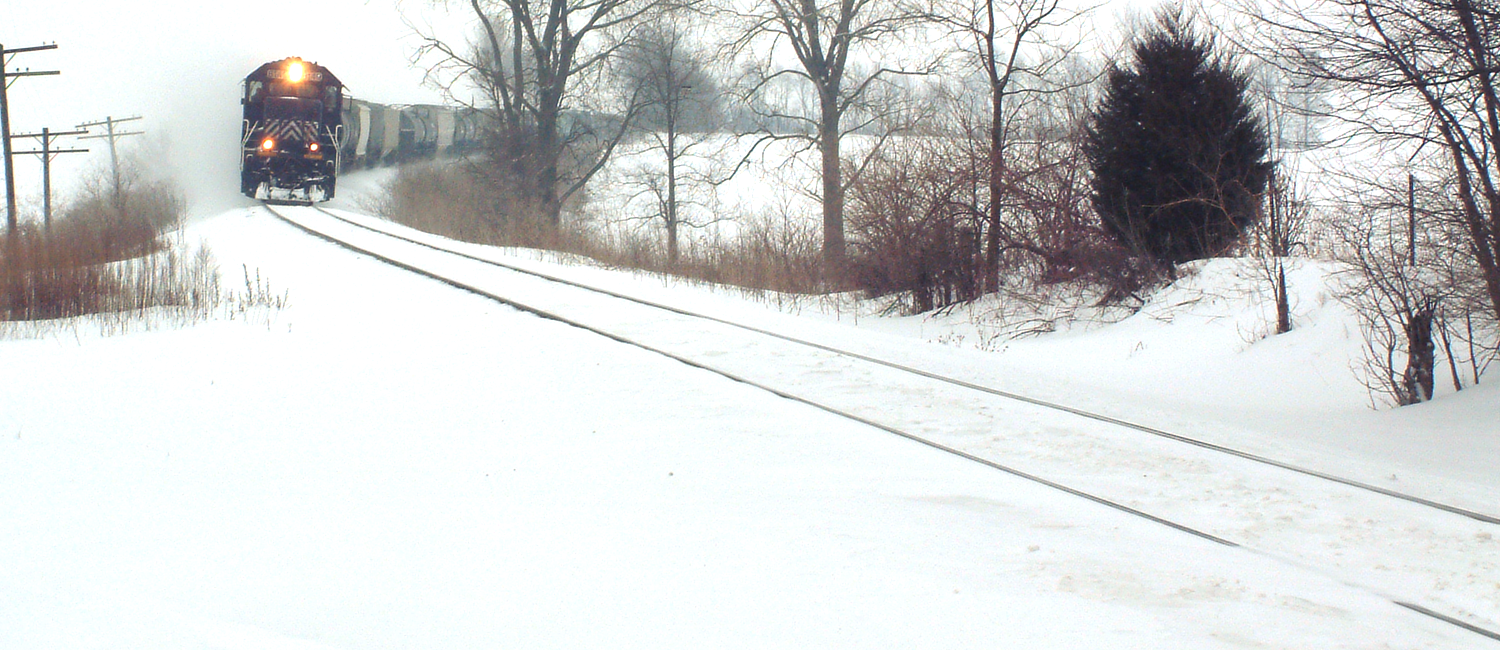
- A freight train approaches South Raub

- Location in Tippecanoe County
- Coordinates: 40°15′27″N 86°54′40″W
- Country: United States
- State: Indiana
- County: Tippecanoe

Government
  - Type: Indiana township

Area
  - Total: 29.92 sq mi (77.5 km^{2})
  - Land: 29.92 sq mi (77.5 km^{2})
  - Water: 0 sq mi (0 km^{2}) 0%
- Elevation: 735 ft (224 m)

Population (2020)
  - Total: 964
  - Density: 31.1/sq mi (12.0/km^{2})
- Time zone: UTC-5 (Eastern (EST))
  - Summer (DST): UTC-4 (EDT)
- ZIP codes: 47909, 47955, 47981
- Area code: 765
- GNIS feature ID: 453781

Randolph Township is one of thirteen townships in Tippecanoe County, Indiana, United States. As of the 2010 census, its population was 931 and it contained 352 housing units. As for 2018, the population is estimated to be 1,084.

== Geography ==
According to the 2010 census, the township has a total area of 29.92 square miles (77.5 km^{2}), all land.

=== Unincorporated communities ===
- Corwin at 40.2517039°N 86.9150069°W
- Romney at 40.2494816°N 86.9041735°W

(This list is based on USGS data and may include former settlements.)

=== Adjacent townships ===
- Wea Township (northeast)
- Lauramie Township (east)
- Madison Township, Montgomery County (southeast)
- Coal Creek Township, Montgomery County (southwest)
- Jackson Township (west)
- Union Township (northwest)

=== Cemeteries ===
The township contains these two cemeteries: Elmwood and Mintonye.

=== Major highways ===
- US Route 231
- Indiana State Road 28

=== Airports and landing strips ===
- Agricultural Seed Airstrip
- Grimes Farm Strip

== School districts ==
- Tippecanoe School Corporation

== Political districts ==
- Indiana's 4th congressional district
- State House District 41
- State Senate District 22
