= Romney, Indiana =

- Unincorporated community and Census-designated place
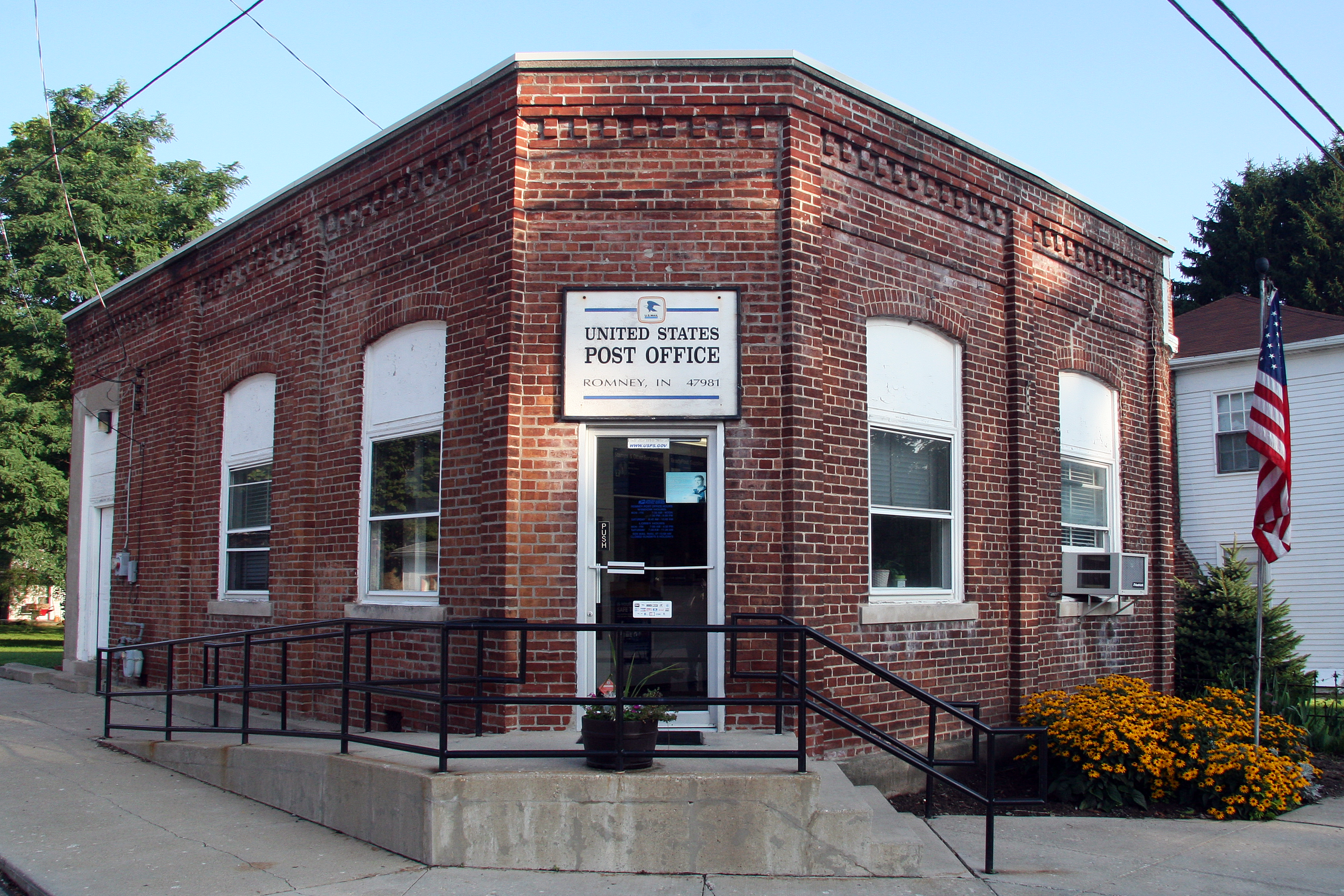
- Post office at the corner of Main and High streets.

- Tippecanoe County's location in Indiana

- Location in Tippecanoe County
- Coordinates: 40°15′05″N 086°54′10″W
- Country: United States
- State: Indiana
- County: Tippecanoe
- Township: Randolph

Area
  - Total: 0.88 sq mi (2.27 km^{2})
  - Land: 0.88 sq mi (2.27 km^{2})
  - Water: 0 sq mi (0.00 km^{2})
- Elevation: 742 ft (226 m)

Population (2020)
  - Total: 304
  - Density: 347.6/sq mi (134.21/km^{2})
- Time zone: UTC-5 (Eastern (EST))
  - Summer (DST): UTC-4 (EDT)
- ZIP code: 47981
- Area code: 765
- GNIS feature ID: 2813358

Romney is an unincorporated community in Randolph Township, Tippecanoe County, in the U.S. state of Indiana. As of the 2020 census, Romney had a population of 304.

The community is part of the Lafayette, Indiana Metropolitan Statistical Area.

== History ==
Originally named Columbia, Romney received its present name from the community of Romney, West Virginia.

The Romney post office has been in operation since 1842.

== Geography ==
Romney is located in Randolph Township, just south of the intersection of U.S. Route 231 and State Road 28.

== Demographics ==
Historical population
| Census | Pop. | Note | %± |
|---|---|---|---|
| 2020 | 304 | | — |
U.S. Decennial Census

== Education ==
It is in the Tippecanoe School Corporation. Residents are zoned to Mintonye Elementary School, Southwestern Middle School, and McCutcheon High School.

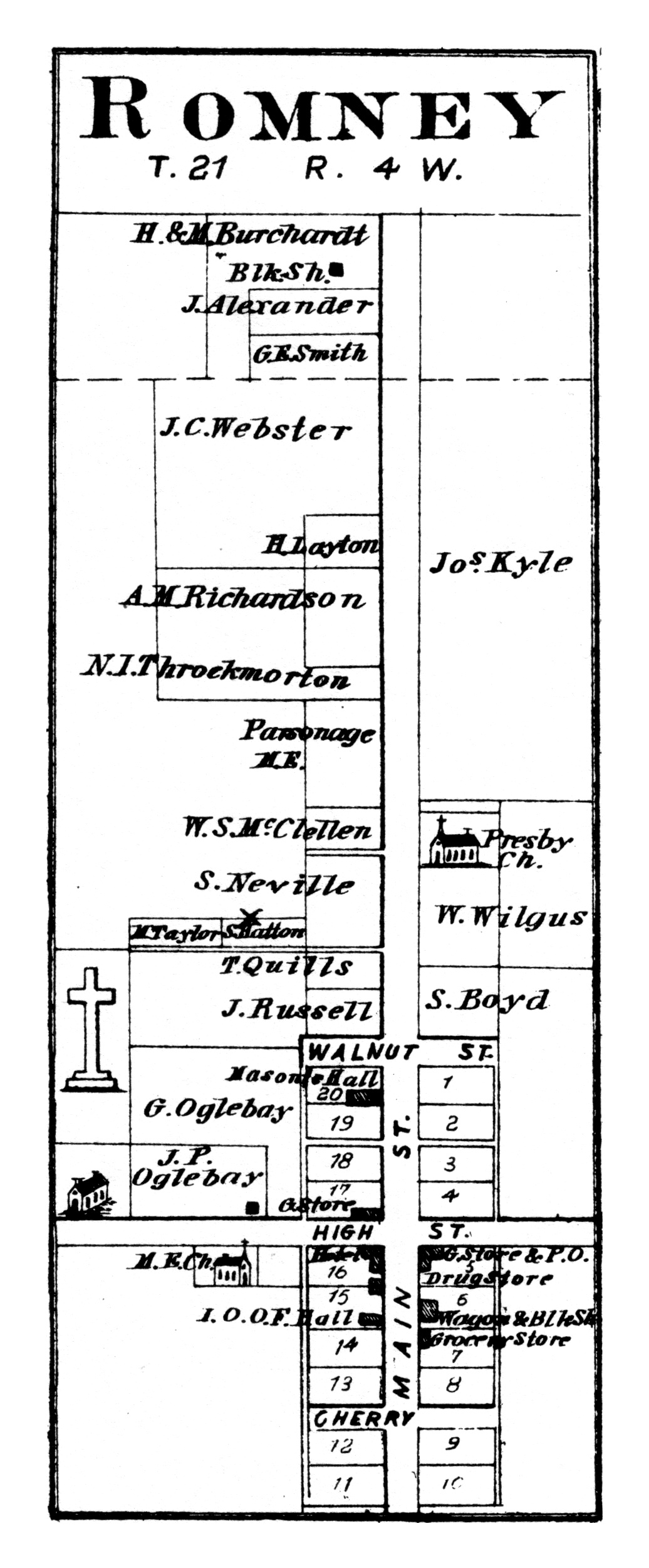
Romney in 1878.

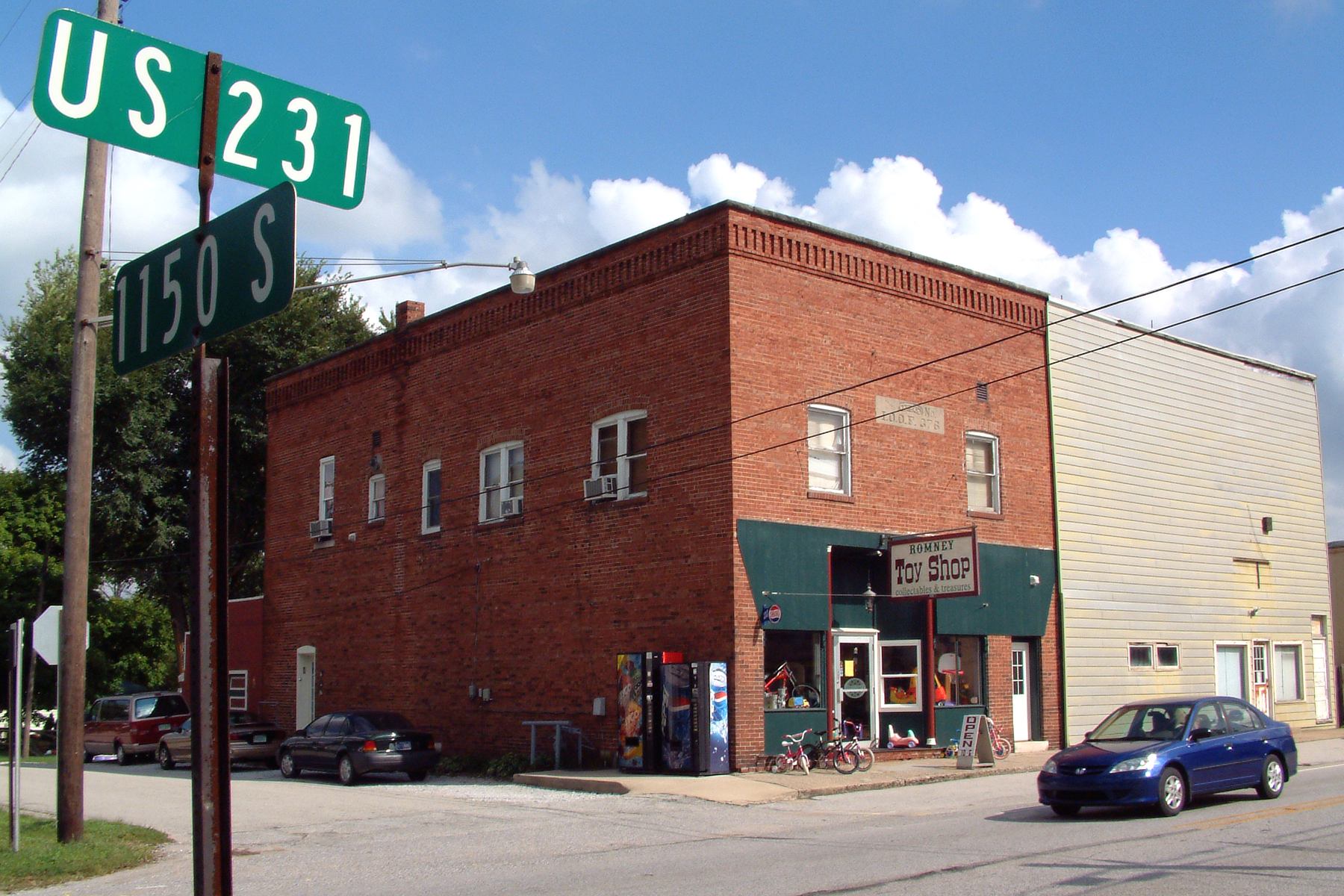
Romney toy shop
