= Stockwell, Indiana =

- Census-designated place
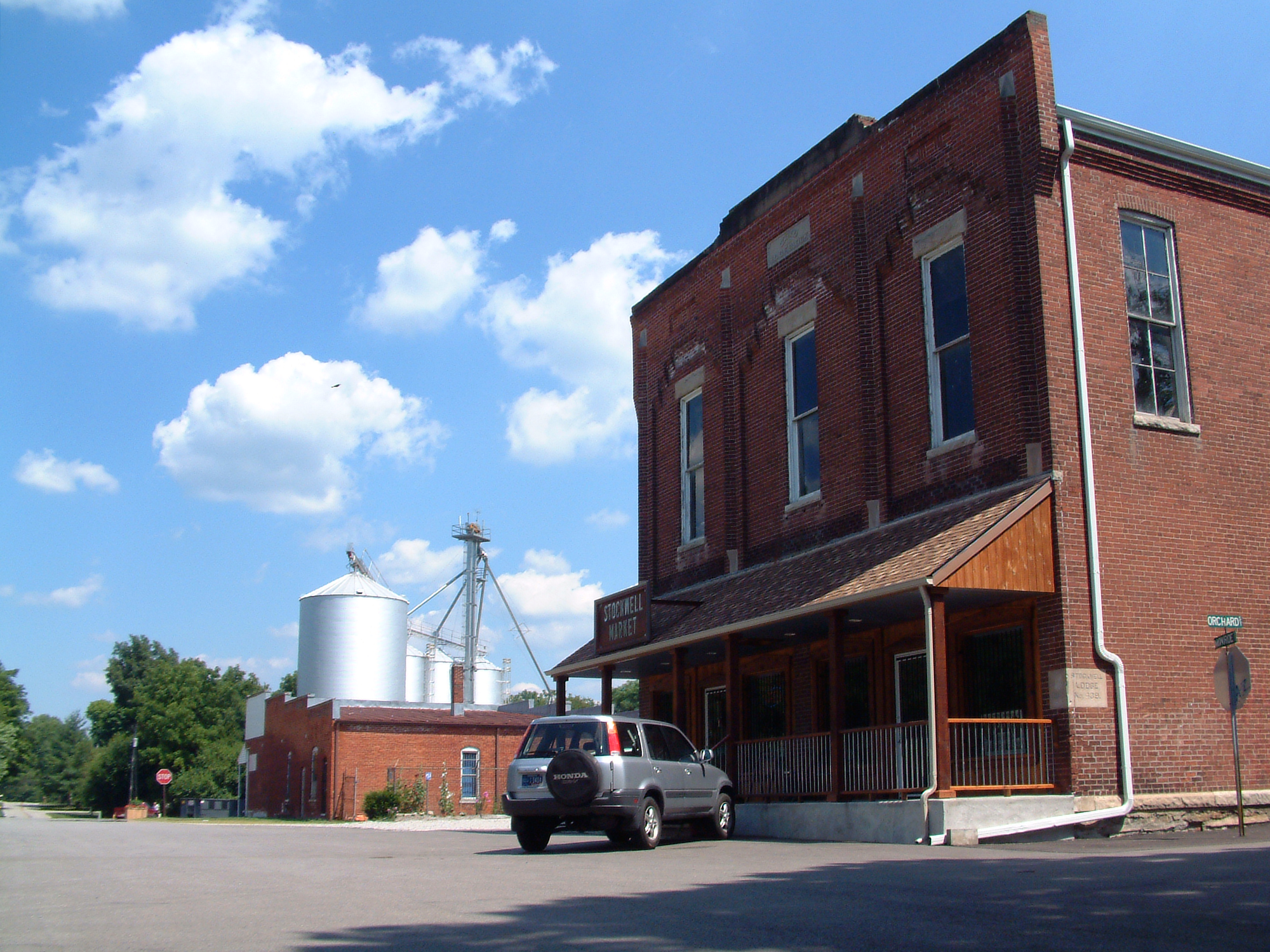
- The corner of Orchard and Monroe.

- Location of Stockwell in Tippecanoe County, Indiana.
- Coordinates: 40°16′50″N 86°45′02″W
- Country: United States
- State: Indiana
- County: Tippecanoe County
- Township: Lauramie
- Founded: 1859

Area
  - Total: 2.47 sq mi (6.40 km^{2})
  - Land: 2.47 sq mi (6.40 km^{2})
- Elevation: 771 ft (235 m)

Population (2020)
  - Total: 494
  - Density: 199.9/sq mi (77.19/km^{2})
- Time zone: UTC-5 (Eastern (EST))
  - Summer (DST): UTC-4 (EDT)
- ZIP code: 47983
- Area code: 765
- GNIS feature ID: 2583472

Stockwell, originally named Lauramie, is a census-designated place in Lauramie Township, Tippecanoe County, in the U.S. state of Indiana. As of the 2020 census, Stockwell had a population of 494. It was once a stop along the Indianapolis, Cincinnati and Lafayette Railroad, but the rail line has since been removed. The community is part of the Lafayette, Indiana Metropolitan Statistical Area.

== History ==
An old variant name of the community was called Bakers Corner. A post office was established under the name Bakers Corners in 1853, and was renamed to Stockwell in 1859. It is still currently in operation.

== Geography ==
Stockwell is on a bend in Lauramie Creek in Lauramie Township, less than two miles west of U.S. Route 52. Stockwell had a population of 545 at the 2010 census.

== Demographics ==
Historical population
Census	Pop.	Note	%±
2010	545		—
2020	494		−9.4%
U.S. Decennial Census

== Education ==
It is in the Tippecanoe School Corporation. Residents are zoned to James Cole Elementary School, Wainwright Middle School, and McCutcheon High School.

== Notable people ==
- Albert Smith White (1803–1864), U.S. senator, U.S. representative, and U.S. district judge from Indiana
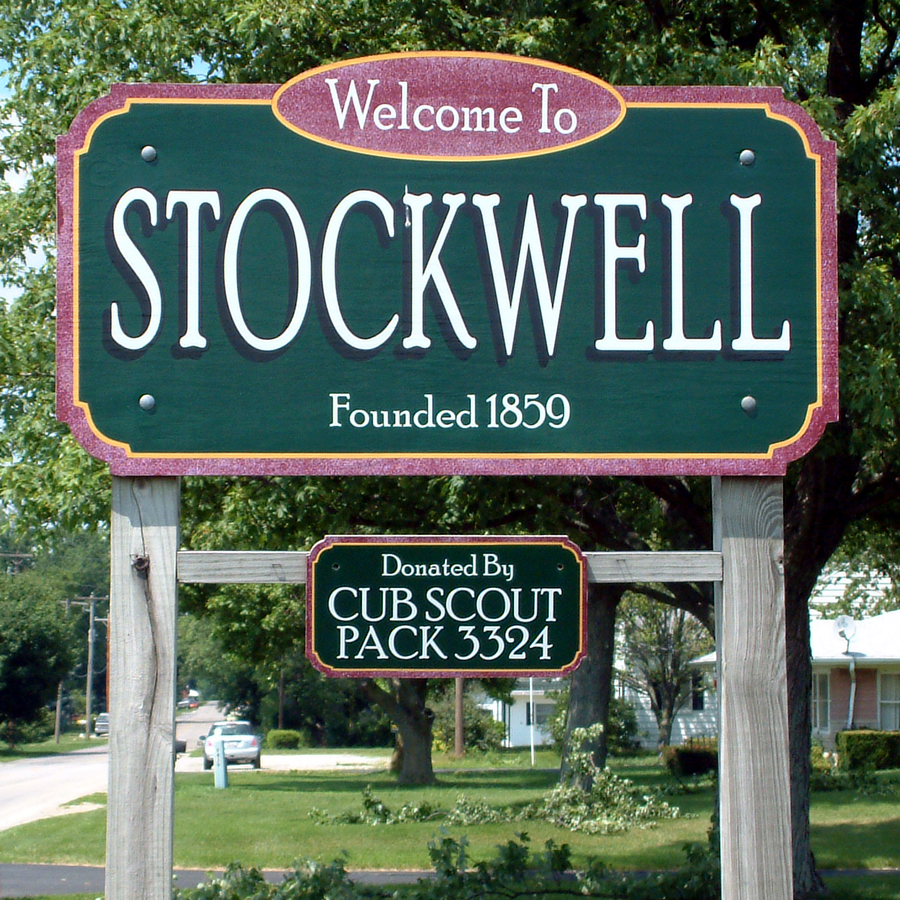
A welcome sign in Stockwell

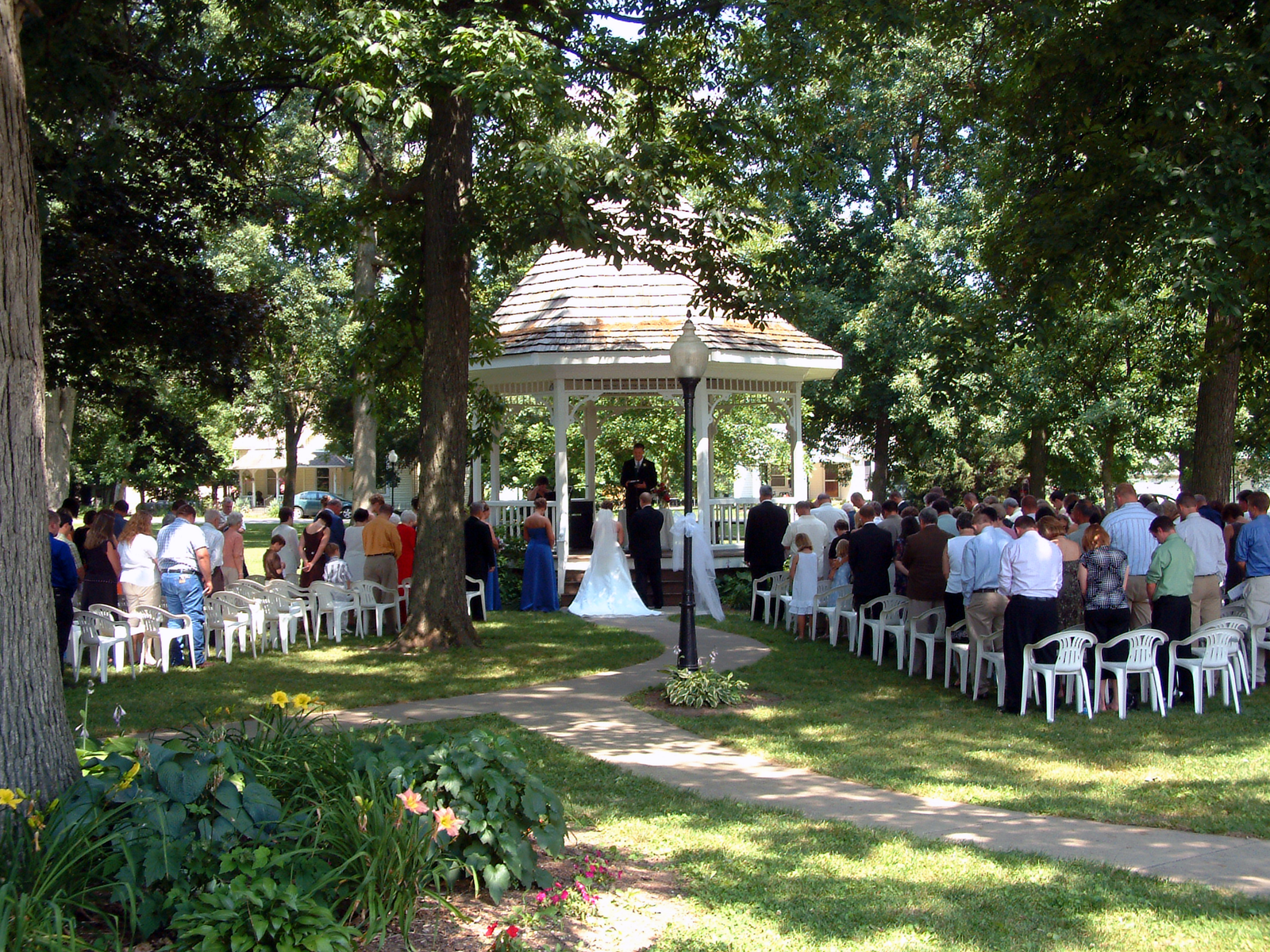
A July 2007 wedding at the town's gazebo

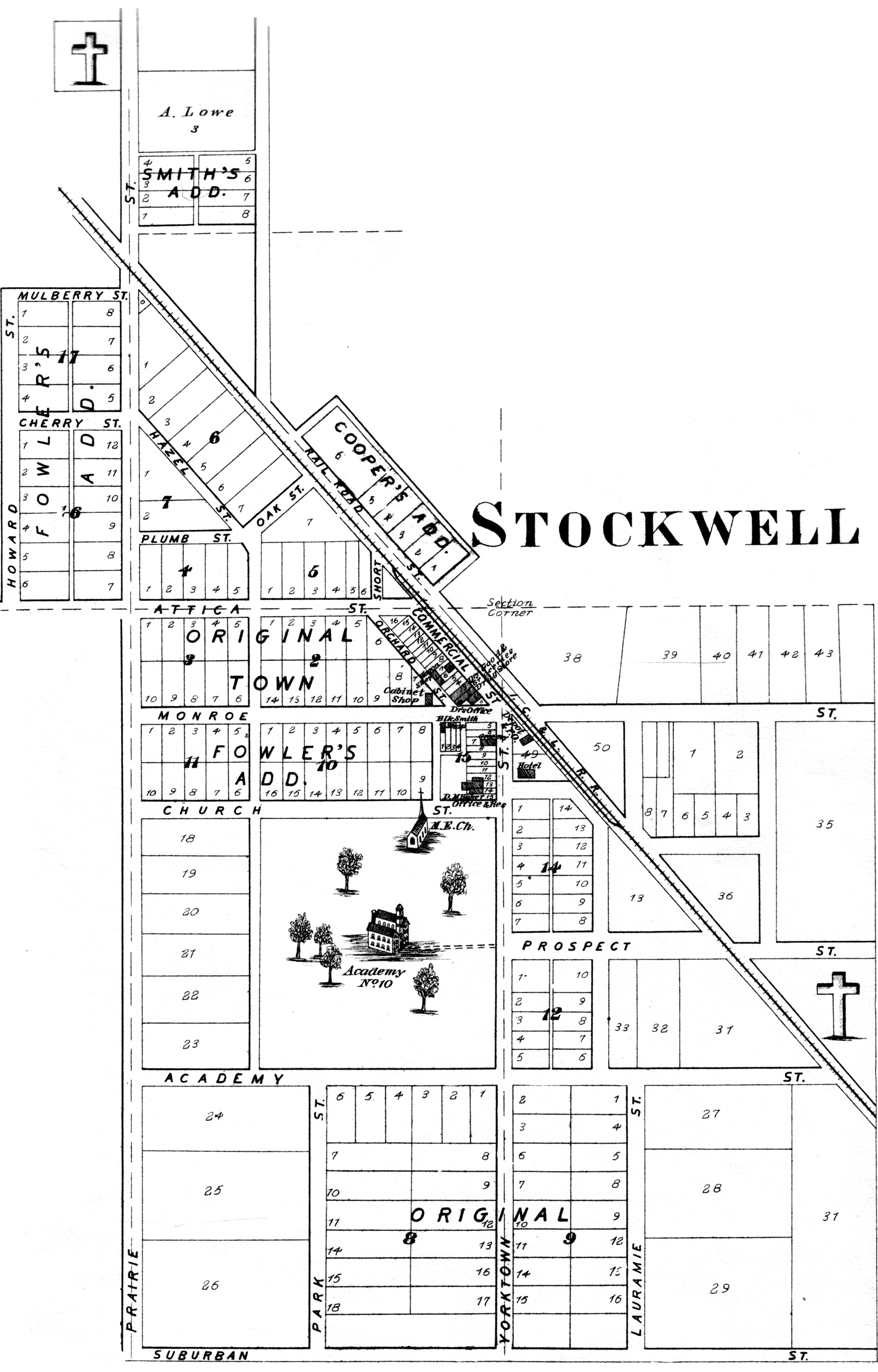
Stockwell in 1878
