= Feast of the Hunters' Moon =

Festival in Indiana, United States

Coordinates: 40°24′23″N 86°57′50″W

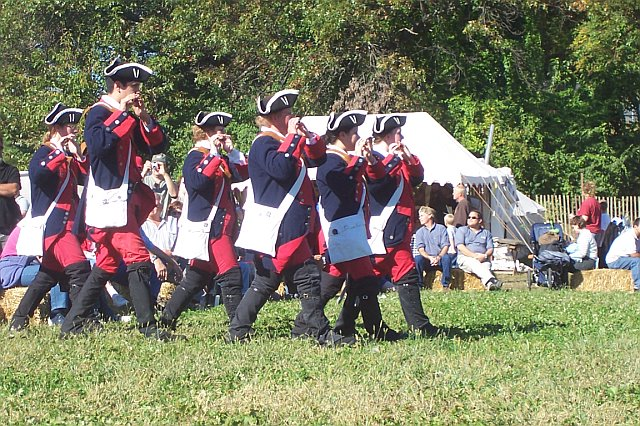
Fifers at the 2006 Feast

Feast of the Hunters' Moon is a weekend festival and historical reenactment held on a weekend in October since 1968, near the present-day site of Fort Ouiatenon, an 18th-century French military and trading post near West Lafayette, Indiana. Traditionally, the Hunters' Moon is the full moon in October, following September's Harvest Moon.

== Site and history ==
The Feast is held on the grounds of the Historic Fort Ouiatenon Park, on the Wabash River. The fort served as a French trading post and was located approximately one mile downriver from the present-day park.

Many Indigenous groups routinely visited Fort Ouiatenon, including the Wea, Kickapoo, Mascouten, Neshnabe (Potawatomi), Piankashaw, Sauk, Meskwaki, Seneca, Miyaamiaa Nations (Miami), Lenape (Delaware), and Shawnee (Sewanee). Waayaahtanonki, also known as Ouiatenon, once stood across the river from the fort. Thousands of people lived in the area surrounding the settlement, which was occupied seasonally. Waayaahtanonki was primarily occupied by the waayaahtanwa, or Wea. Modern Indigenous groups related to the waayaahtanwa include the Miami Nation of Indiana and the Peoria Tribe of Indians of Oklahoma. Although modern interpretations of interactions between Indigenous groups and European Americans are portrayed as peaceful, constant interpersonal conflicts and violence took place at Waayaahtanonki.

== Festival and historical reenactment ==
During the festival, participants reenact the annual fall gathering of the French and Native Americans which took place at Fort Ouiatenon in the mid-18th century. Participants dress in the garb of the 18th century French soldiers, settlers, and Native Americans who lived in this region. Food vendors sell traditional period foods such as rabbit stew, voyageur stew, and venison sausage. The program also includes music, marching, dancing and reenacted military maneuvers.

=== Musical performances ===
As part of the event, various musical acts perform, including Native American drummers, historical folk music performers, French folksingers and period fife and drum corps.

=== Living history presentations ===
The event includes historical reenactments featuring period characters from the 1700s to educate visitors about the lives and culture of the period. Each year, Indigenous participants construct a temporary Wea village at the festival. The festival requires Indigenous first-person interpreters to wear "...Eastern Woodlands Indian dress of the period." This requirement perpetuates the idea that Indigenous cultures remain unchanged and does not allow Indigenous first-person interpreters to interpret the history of their communities from a modern perspective.

One historical interpreter presented a Delaware Indian who first served as a scout for the French and whose people lived along the Wabash River in the 1700s and co-existed peacefully with the French at the outpost. Others play traders and gunsmiths, such as "Pierre Rolletof" of French Scots-Irish descent who traveled along the Wabash River trading a range of items, including guns, and also gunsmithed as he traveled. Other reenactors have demonstrated various period trades and crafts, including a chairmaker who built Windsor chairs to order, spending 40–45 hours per chair.

=== Size and production ===
In 2004, the annual event drew over 8,000 participants and over 60,000 spectators. The Tippecanoe County Historical Association, cooperating with the Tippecanoe County Parks Department, presents the event on a weekend in late September or early October. The annual event ran for its 44th year in 2011. 2017 marked its 50th anniversary and the 300th anniversary of the fort. The event was cancelled during the Pandemic of 2020 but resumed in 2021.
