= Granville, Indiana =

- Ghost town
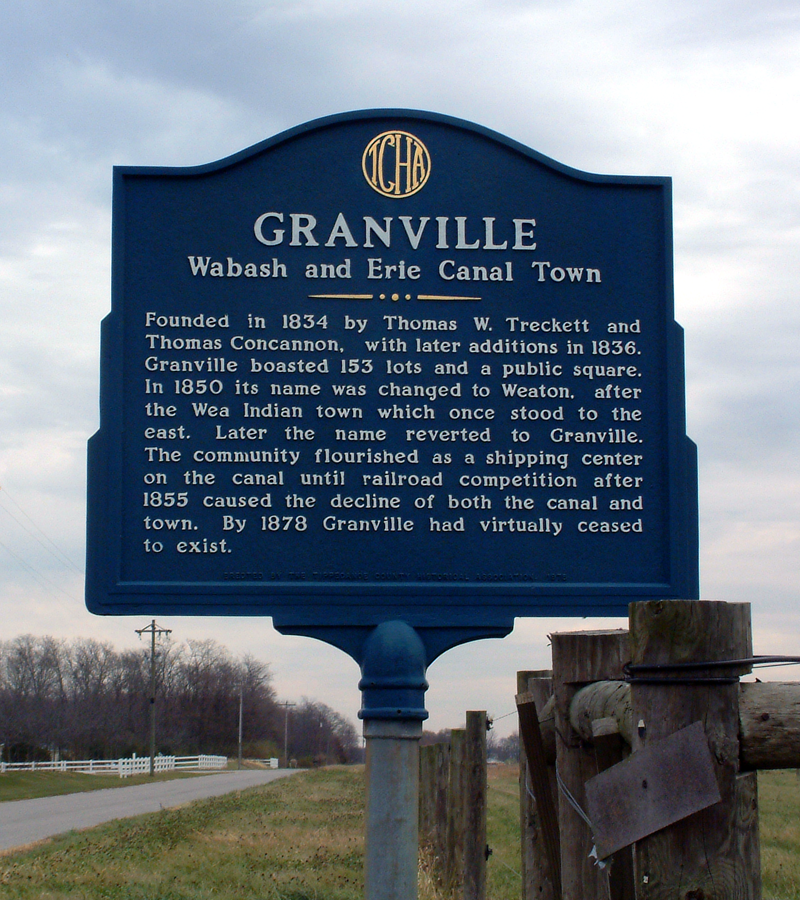
- The historical marker near Granville.

- Tippecanoe County's location in Indiana

- Location in Tippecanoe County
- Coordinates: 40°24′25″N 87°01′53″W
- Country: United States
- State: Indiana
- County: Tippecanoe
- Township: Wayne
- Elevation: 550 ft (170 m)
- Time zone: UTC-5 (Eastern (EST))
  - Summer (DST): UTC-4 (EDT)
- ZIP code: 47909
- Area code: 765

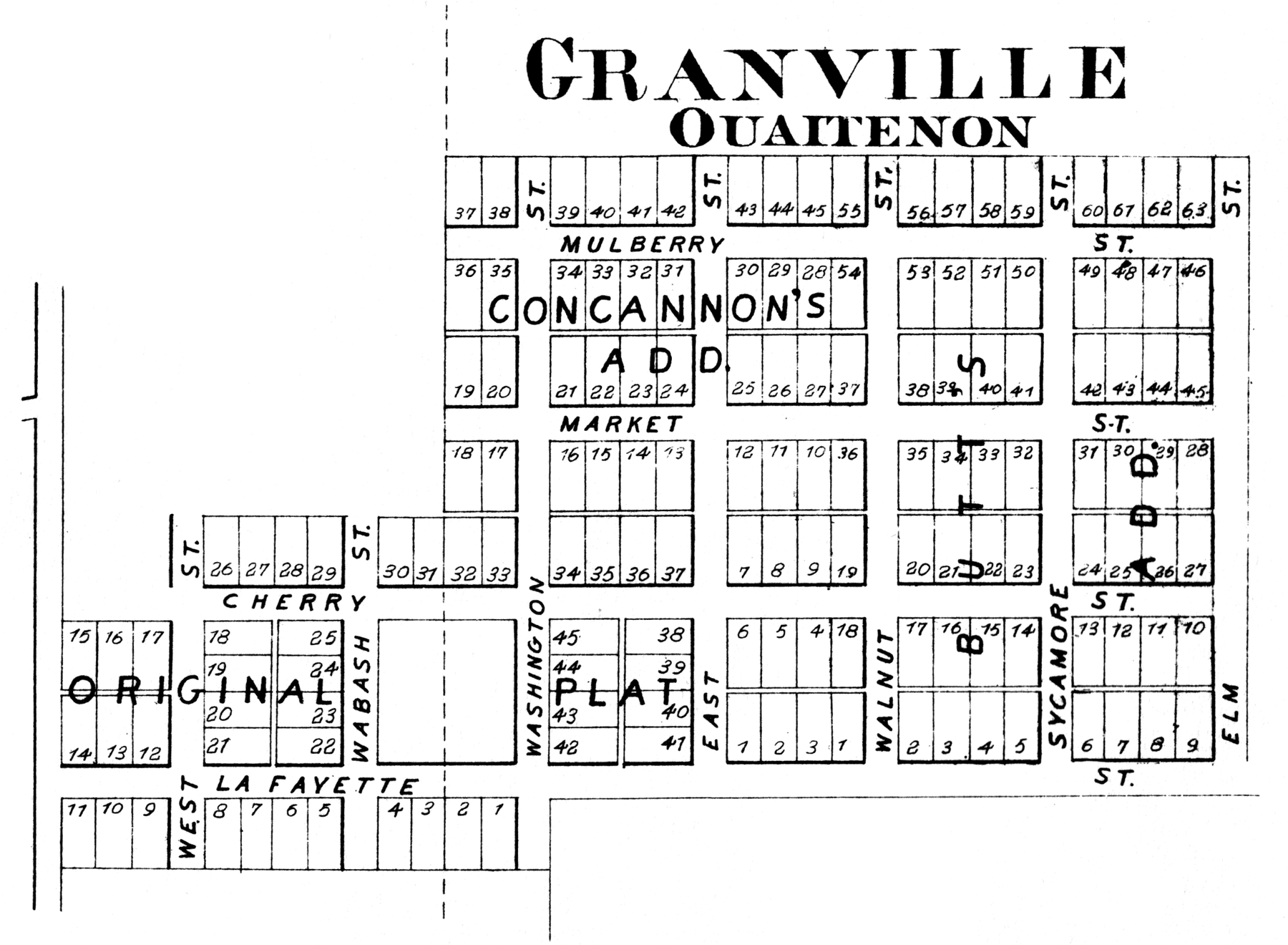
Granville in 1878

Granville is a former town in Wayne Township, Tippecanoe County, in the U.S. state of Indiana.

== History ==
Thomas W. Treckett and Thomas Concannon founded the town in 1834 on the south side of the Wabash and Erie Canal, just south of the Wabash River near the former site of the Native American settlement of Ouiatenon. They platted the town to contain 153 lots, a public square and several streets, with such names as Lafayette, Cherry, Wabash and Washington. This plat is still in effect, with the lots and streets still visible in the county's GIS.

In 1850 the town's name was changed to Weaton, after the local Wea Indians (some maps incorrectly labeled it as "Wheaton"). They had been mostly removed west of the Mississippi River by treaties with the United States government. Later the name was changed back to Granville. The town flourished as a shipping center on the canal until the mid-1850s, when railroad competition drew off much of the business. With the decline of canal traffic, the town's economy also declined sharply. By 1878 Granville had virtually ceased to exist.

The cemetery east of the town and the nearby bridge across the Wabash River still bear the name of Granville, though these areas are now serviced by the postal service as a part of West Point, Indiana.

== Geography ==
Granville was located at 40°24′25″ N, 87°01′53″ W (40.406944, -87.031389) in Wayne Township, and has an elevation of approximately 550 feet. This is not far west of Lafayette, close to present-day Shadeland.
