= Ouiatenon =

Ouiatenon Waayaahtanonki
- Village
- Location within Indiana
- Coordinates: 40°24′3″N 86°57′36″W
- Country: United States
- State: Indiana
- County: Tippecanoe
- Settled: c. 1680s
- Destroyed: 1 June 1791
- Elevation: 600 ft (180 m)
- Highest elevation: 600 ft (180 m)
- Lowest elevation: 500 ft (150 m)

Ouiatenon (Miami-Illinois: waayaahtanonki) was a dwelling place of members of the Wea tribe of Native Americans. The name Ouiatenon, also variously given as Ouiatanon, Oujatanon, Ouiatano or other similar forms, is a French rendering of a term from the Wea dialect of the Miami-Illinois language which means "place of the people of the whirlpool", an ethnonym for the Wea. Ouiatenon can be said to refer generally to any settlement of Wea or to their tribal lands as a whole, though the name is most frequently used to refer to a group of extinct settlements situated together along the Wabash River in what is now western Tippecanoe County, Indiana.

== History ==
=== Establishment ===
By the late 17th century the Miami-speaking peoples, of which the Wea were a part, had begun to return to their homelands in the Wabash River Valley, an area they had earlier been driven from by the eastern Iroquois. The several tribal bands of Miami separated as they settled the valley, with the Wea occupying the middle Wabash Valley between the Eel River in the north and the Vermilion River in the south. Of the Wea's five major settlements, Ouiatenon was the largest concentration; it was described in August 1791 by U.S. General James Wilkinson as "the chief town of the Ouiatenon Nation."

The Ouiatenon site was favorably located for trade and habitation, being situated on a fertile plain near what was considered to be the head of deep water navigation on the Wabash River. It was also well supplied with fish, plentiful near the mouth of Wea Creek, and with wild game in the surrounding prairie and woodlands. Ouiatenon consisted of two large villages and two or three smaller ones located along or near the Wabash River between the mouth of Wea Creek in the east and mouth of Riviere de Bois Rouge (later Indian Creek) in the west, a distance of between four and five miles (8 km). One village, located on the north bank of the river opposite the main Ouiatenon town, was chiefly inhabited by Kickapoo.

=== French period ===
The French, in an effort to counter British influence over the area, established a military post on the north bank of the Wabash opposite Ouiatenon in 1717, a site now known as Fort Ouiatenon. European settlement in the area surrounding the fort was sparse because the post's commandants did not make grants of land to settlers as was done elsewhere; however, it did become one of the most successful trading posts in the region. In 1760 the French agreed to withdraw from the valley and ceded the area to British control.

=== Destruction ===
On 9 March 1791, U.S. Secretary of War Henry Knox issued orders from President George Washington to Brigadier General Charles Scott of Kentucky to lead a punitive expedition against the Wea settlements in the Wabash Valley. Just after noon on 1 June 1791, Scott with a force of 33 officers and 760 mounted Kentucky volunteers crested High Gap Hill and entered the Wea Plains. Perceiving two villages to the northwest, at two miles (3 km) and four miles (6 km) out, Scott sent a small detachment under Colonel John Hardin to destroy them while he and the bulk of his force continued north toward the main Ouiatenon village near the mouth of Wea Creek, where the smoke of cooking fires could be seen.

Rounding the fringe of trees at the bend in Wea Creek, Scott's forces found the Ouiatenon town in the bottom land near the Wabash and descended upon it, causing panic amongst the inhabitants. Some in canoes tried to escape to the Kickapoo village opposite, but were killed by riflemen before reaching the opposite shore; 41 women and children were taken prisoner; the remainder were killed, dispersed or escaped. Scott burned the town and several hundred acres of growing corn.

=== Post-destruction ===
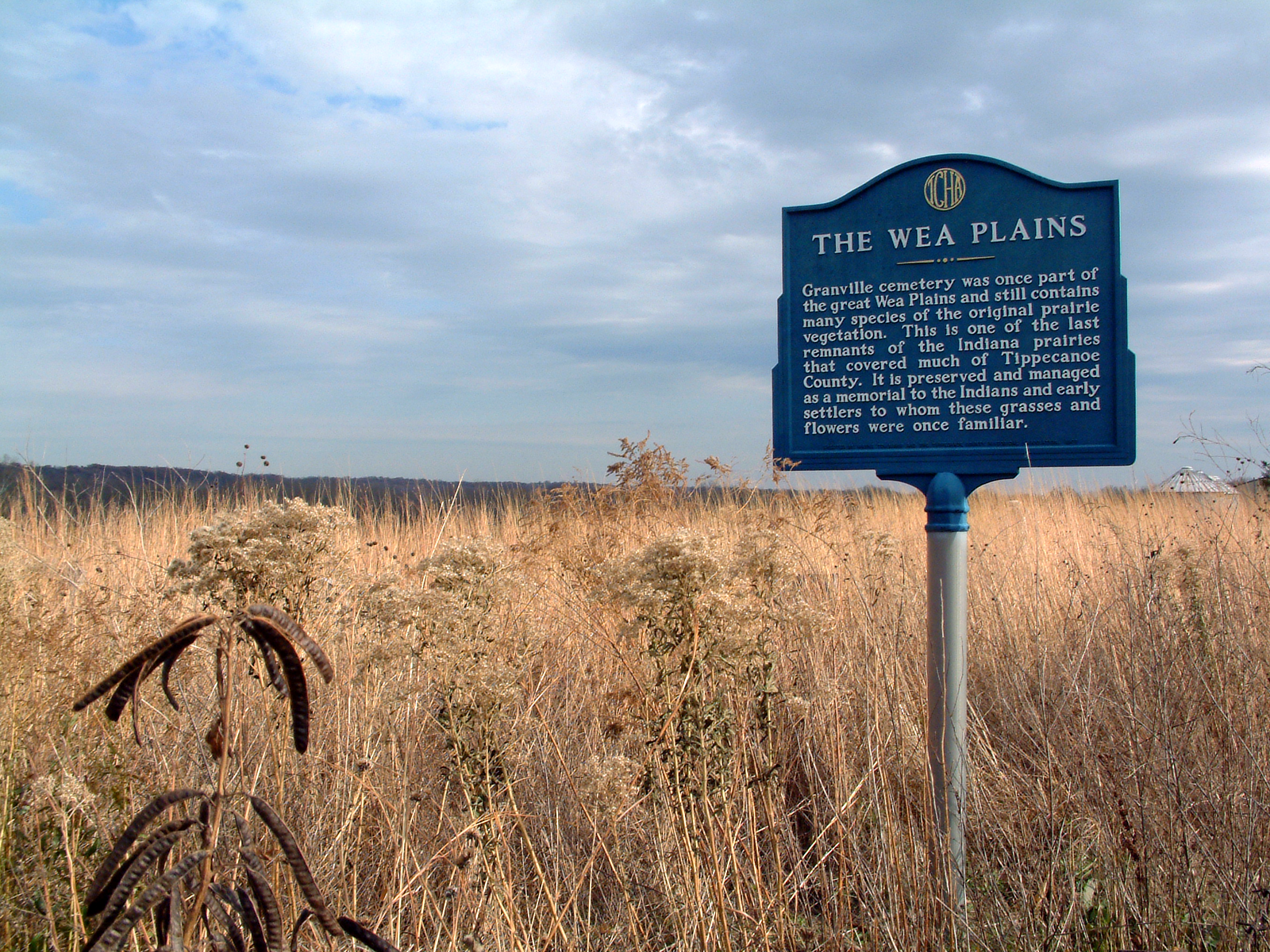
The Wea Plains historical marker near Granville.

Vestiges of Ouiatenon remained visible for many years after its destruction, and artifacts could be easily found after the grass had been burned off in the autumn. A small town named Granville or Weaton was founded in 1834 near the site of the westernmost Ouiatenon village and prospered from the presence of the Wabash and Erie Canal, built through the area in the 1840s. Both the canal and town declined in the 1850s and were defunct by the 1870s.

The towns of Glen Hall and Shadeland remain on the southern and eastern periphery of the plain. Tippecanoe Labs, a large chemical laboratory and manufacturing complex operated by Evonik Industries, stands just east of the mouth of Wea Creek; the site of the main Ouiatenon town and surrounding area is owned by the labs and is partly contained within the Tippecanoe Labs Wildlife Habitat.

== Geography ==
The villages of Ouiatenon occupied a fertile area known as the Wea Plains, a roughly 25-square-mile (65 km^{2}) area in what is now northern Wayne and Union townships.

To the north lies the long range of the Indian Hills, crowned with forest trees, and scarped with many a sharp ravine. At the southern edge of these hills flows the Wabash, winding in and out with graceful curves, and marked in its courses by a narrow fringe of woodland. To the east lies Wea creek, jutting out into the plain with a sharp turn, and then gliding on again to the river. Within this enclosure of wood and stream lie the meadows of the Ouiatenons...

Lost Creek, a small waterway with no distinct end, flows west-northwest through the Wea Plains.

== See also ==
- Fort Ouiatenon
