= Fort Ouiatenon =

Fortified European settlement in Indiana

- West Lafayette, Indiana

Site information
- Type: Fort
- Controlled by: New France; Great Britain; First Nations

Site history
- Built: 1717
- In use: 1717–1791

Garrison information
- Past commanders: François-Marie Bissot(Fr); Edward Jenkins(Br)
- Fort Ouiatenon Archeological District
- U.S. National Register of Historic Places
- U.S. National Historic Landmark District
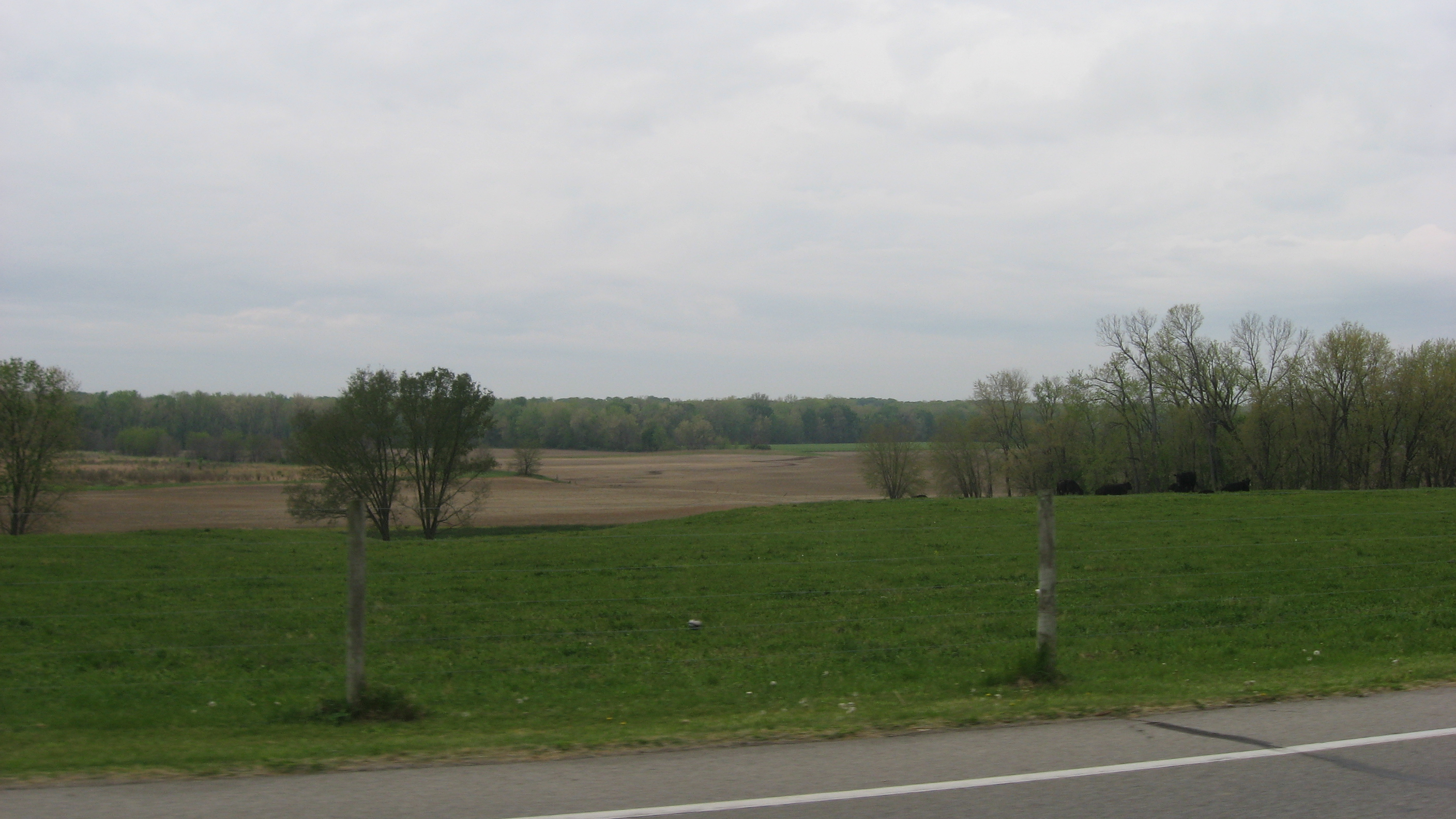
- Fields at the site

- Location within Tippecanoe County, Indiana Location within Indiana Location within the United States
- Nearest city: Lafayette, Indiana
- Area: 17.5 acres (7.1 ha)
- Built: 1717
- NRHP reference No.: 70000008, 100006239

Significant dates
- Added to NRHP: February 16, 1970
- Designated NHLD: January 13, 2021

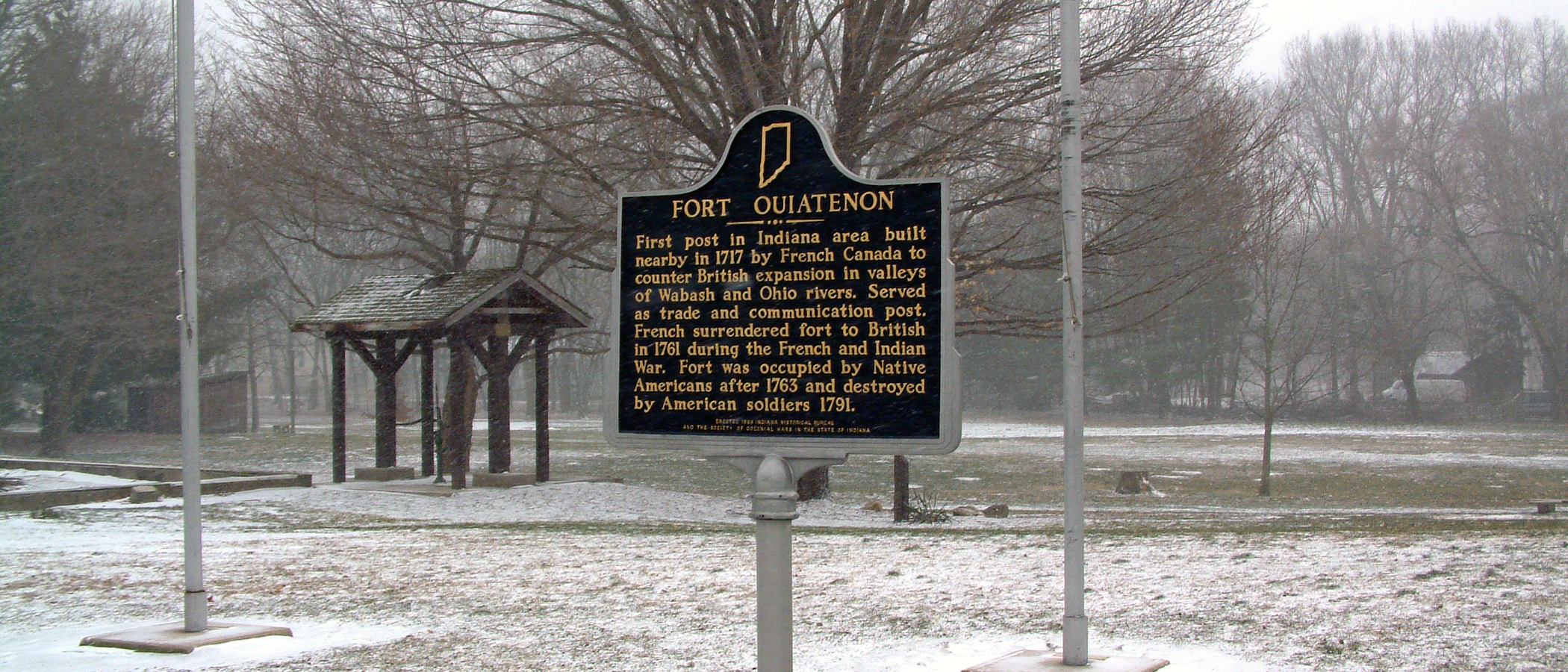
The historical marker at Fort Ouiatenon.

Fort Ouiatenon, built in 1717, was the first fortified European settlement in what is now Indiana, United States. It was a palisade stockade with log blockhouse used as a French trading post on the Wabash River located approximately three miles southwest of modern-day West Lafayette. The name 'Ouiatenon' is a French rendering of the name in the Wea language, waayaahtanonki, meaning 'place of the whirlpool'. It was one of three French forts built during the 18th century in what was then New France, later the Northwest Territory and today the state of Indiana, the other two being Fort Miami and Fort Vincennes. A substantial French settlement grew up around the fort in the mid-18th century. It was ceded to the British and abandoned after the French and Indian War. Later, it passed into Indian hands and was destroyed in 1791 by American militia during the Northwest Indian War. Consequently, Fort Ouiatenon was never a United States fort. The original site was rediscovered in the 1960s; the archaeological site was listed on the National Register of Historic Places in 1970, and was designated a National Historic Landmark in 2021.

Every year between the end of September and the month of October, a reenactment of pioneer life called the Feast of the Hunters' Moon is held a short distance from the original site at Fort Ouiatenon Historical Park.

== French period ==
Fort Ouiatenon was originally constructed by the Government of New France as a military outpost to protect against Great Britain's western expansion. Its location among the unsettled woodlands of the Wabash River valley also made it a key center of trade for fur trappers. French merchants and trappers from Quebec would arrive at Fort Ouiatenon in search of beaver pelts and to take advantage of trade relations with the native Wea Indian tribes.

In 1717, Ensign François Picote de Beletre (related to another Picoté de Bélestre, see Adam Dollard des Ormeaux) arrived at the mouth of the Tippecanoe and Wabash with four soldiers, three men, a blacksmith [Jean Richard, a son of Guillaume Richard dit Lafleur and Agnes Tessier] and supplies to trade with the nearby Wea people, an Algonquian-speaking nation closely related to the Miami people. They built a stockade on the Wabash, eighteen miles below the mouth of the Tippecanoe. François-Marie Bissot, the Sieur de Vincennes assumed command of the fort sometime in the 1720s. The French settled on the north bank, with Wea villages on the south bank. The boundary between the French colonies of Louisiana and Canada, although inexact in the first years of the settlement, was decreed in 1745 to run between Ouiatenon and Fort Vincennes.

In order to convince the Wea to trade exclusively with the French, the Governor-General of New France, Philippe de Rigaud Vaudreuil, issued permits for trade at Ouiatenon. Traders immediately began to bring a steady flow of goods to the new town. Soon the officials in Louisiana sent more men to help Vincennes to hold the Wabash River. Ouiatenon was described as "the finest palisaded fort in the upper country," and was one of the most successful trading posts in the region. At its peak level of activity during the mid-18th century, Fort Ouiatenon may have supported over 3,000 residents, and it was central to a hub of five Wea and two Kickapoo villages.

== British period ==
After the surrender of New France to the British in September 1760, Robert Rogers dispatched troops to occupy Ouiatenon. A contingent of British soldiers led by Lieutenant Edward Jenkins arrived in 1761, capturing and occupying the fort.

On June 1, 1763, during Pontiac's War, the Wea, Kickapoo and Mascouten peoples captured Ouiatenon. They surprised Lieutenant Jenkins and his men and captured Fort Ouiatenon without firing a shot. Seven similar posts were also captured in the widespread Indian uprising against the British presence.

The British made little use of Fort Ouiatenon after the French and Indian War; it was never garrisoned. In the mid-1770s, the fort was described as 70 yards from the Wabash river.

The Ouiatenon nation of Indians is on the opposite side, & the Kiccaposses are round the Fort, in both villages about 1000 men able to bear arms.

As late as 1778, Ouiatenon was a staging ground for war parties fighting on behalf of the British government.

== Indian period ==
Captain Leonard Helm and Lt. Bailey arrived in 1778 to secure the fort for the rebelling Americans. A British Indian agent named Celeron controlled the fort and tried to evacuate, but was captured with a force of 40 men. A British company arrived and hoisted "St. George's Ensign" in the fort by December of the same year. Shortly after the Americans captured Vincennes in 1779, Captain I. Shelby arrived in Ouiatenon and received promises of cooperation from the Wea.

During the 1780s, however, local Indian tribes used it as a base of operations in resistance against the westward expansion of white American settlers. Consequently, President George Washington ordered the fort to be destroyed in 1791. In an operation dubbed the "Blackberry Campaign", Northwest Territory Governor Arthur St. Clair ordered General Charles Scott to attack villages along the Wabash River, with Ouiatenon as the primary target. Scott crossed the Ohio River in May 1791 and marched to the Ouiatenon area with 750 Kentucky militia. While Colonel John Hardin led a force to the Big Pine Creek to destroy a large Kickapoo village, Scott led the main force to Ouiatenon. The American Indians who were present evacuated, and Colonel James Wilkinson led a battalion of mounted militia down to the river to fire on escaping Indians. Ouiatenon was then burned to the ground, and the militia destroyed several other nearby villages, including the large village of Keth-tio-e-ca-muck near the mouth of the Tippecanoe River. 38 Native Americans had been killed, and another 58 were taken prisoner, mostly women and children. The Kentucky militia had no men killed, and only five wounded.

Ouiatenon was never again a site of historical significance.

== Twentieth century ==
The ruins of the old fort were lost, and the land became a farm in the 20th century.

The site of Fort Ouiatenon was discovered and confirmed archaeologically in the late 1960s, but without the framework of James H. Kellar, an earlier investigator of the site. The Ouiatenon Preserve is located about a mile west of the Fort Ouiatenon Historical Park along South River Road and the Wabash River. It contains the site of the original 1700s era Fort Ouiatenon and nearly 200 acres of land surrounding it. In 1970 the site was placed on the National Register of Historic Places by the U.S. Department of the Interior.

In 1930, a local physician named Richard Wetherill built what he thought was a replica of the fort's blockhouse on land about a mile east of the fort's true location. The Daughters of the American Revolution, also mistaken about the fort's true location, had placed a small commemorative marker near this spot in 1909. Since few useful records of the original structure exist, the reconstruction is mostly conjecture and not accurate. Dr. Wetherill's blockhouse was actually patterned after those more typical of British fortifications (using horizontal logs) and does not match the style or type of construction of the original Fort Ouiatenon (with vertical logs). The blockhouse is now the focal point of Fort Ouiatenon Historical Park. Today, the Fort Ouiatenon Blockhouse Museum is open to tourists in the summer and is the location of the annual Feast of the Hunters' Moon. Many rare artifacts from the original Fort Ouiatenon are displayed by the Tippecanoe County Historical Association during the Feast.

== See also ==
- List of archaeological sites on the National Register of Historic Places in Indiana
- List of forts in Indiana
- List of museums in Indiana
- List of National Historic Landmarks in Indiana
- National Register of Historic Places listings in Tippecanoe County, Indiana
- Ouiatenon

== Bibliography ==
- Allison, Harold (1986). The Tragic Saga of the Indiana Indians. Turner Publishing Company, Paducah. ISBN 0-938021-07-9.
- Cayton, Andrew R. L. (1996). Frontier Indiana. Bloomington, IN: Indiana University Press.
- Dunn, Jacob Piatt, ed. (1894). The Road from Detroit to the Illinois. Documents relating to the French Settlements on the Wabash. Indiana Historical Society Publications. Archived from the original on December 16, 2007.
- English, William Hayden (1896). Conquest of the Country Northwest of the River Ohio 1778–1783 and Life of Gen. George Rogers Clark. Vol I. The Bowen-Merrill Company, Indianapolis, Ind., and Kansas City, Mo.
