= Wayne Township, Tippecanoe County, Indiana =

Wayne Township
- Township
- Location in Tippecanoe County
- Coordinates: 40°21′15″N 87°02′27″W
- Country: United States
- State: Indiana
- County: Tippecanoe

Government
  - Type: Indiana township

Area
  - Total: 34.63 sq mi (89.7 km^{2})
  - Land: 34.28 sq mi (88.8 km^{2})
  - Water: 0.35 sq mi (0.91 km^{2}) 1.01%
- Elevation: 617 ft (188 m)

Population (2020)
  - Total: 1,685
  - Density: 46.1/sq mi (17.8/km^{2})
- Time zone: UTC-5 (Eastern (EST))
  - Summer (DST): UTC-4 (EDT)
- ZIP codes: 47906, 47909, 47918, 47992
- Area code: 765
- GNIS feature ID: 454041

Wayne Township is one of thirteen townships in Tippecanoe County, Indiana, United States. As of the 2010 census, its population was 1,580 and it contained 623 housing units.

== Geography ==
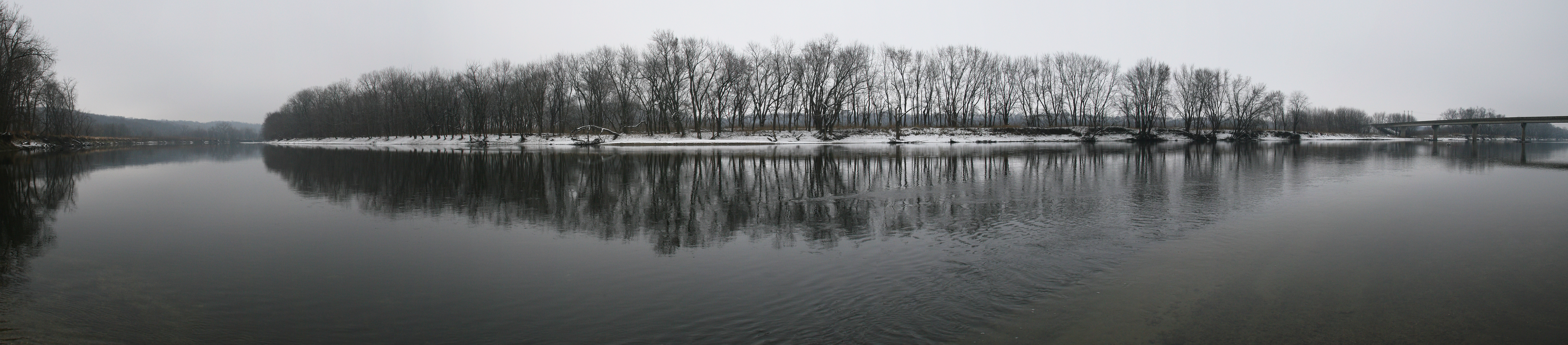
The Wabash River forms the township's northern border. Photo looks toward the extinct communities of Ouiatenon and Granville.

According to the 2010 census, the township has a total area of 34.63 square miles (89.7 km^{2}), of which 34.28 square miles (88.8 km^{2}) (or 98.99%) is land and 0.35 square miles (0.91 km^{2}) (or 1.01%) is water.

=== Unincorporated communities ===
- Glenhall at 40.3542030°N 87.0408434°W
- West Point at 40.3450364°N 87.0430655°W

(This list is based on USGS data and may include former settlements.)

=== Adjacent townships ===
- Shelby Township (north)
- Wabash Township (northeast)
- Union Township (east)
- Jackson Township (south)
- Davis Township, Fountain County (southwest)
- Warren Township, Warren County (west)

=== Cemeteries ===
The township contains these three cemeteries: Granville, Marks and Sherry.

=== Major highways ===
- Indiana State Road 25

== School JDH, Glen Hall 24 ==
- Tippecanoe School Corporation

== Political districts ==
- Indiana's 4th congressional district
- State House District 41
- State Senate District 22
