= West Point, Indiana =

- Census-designated place
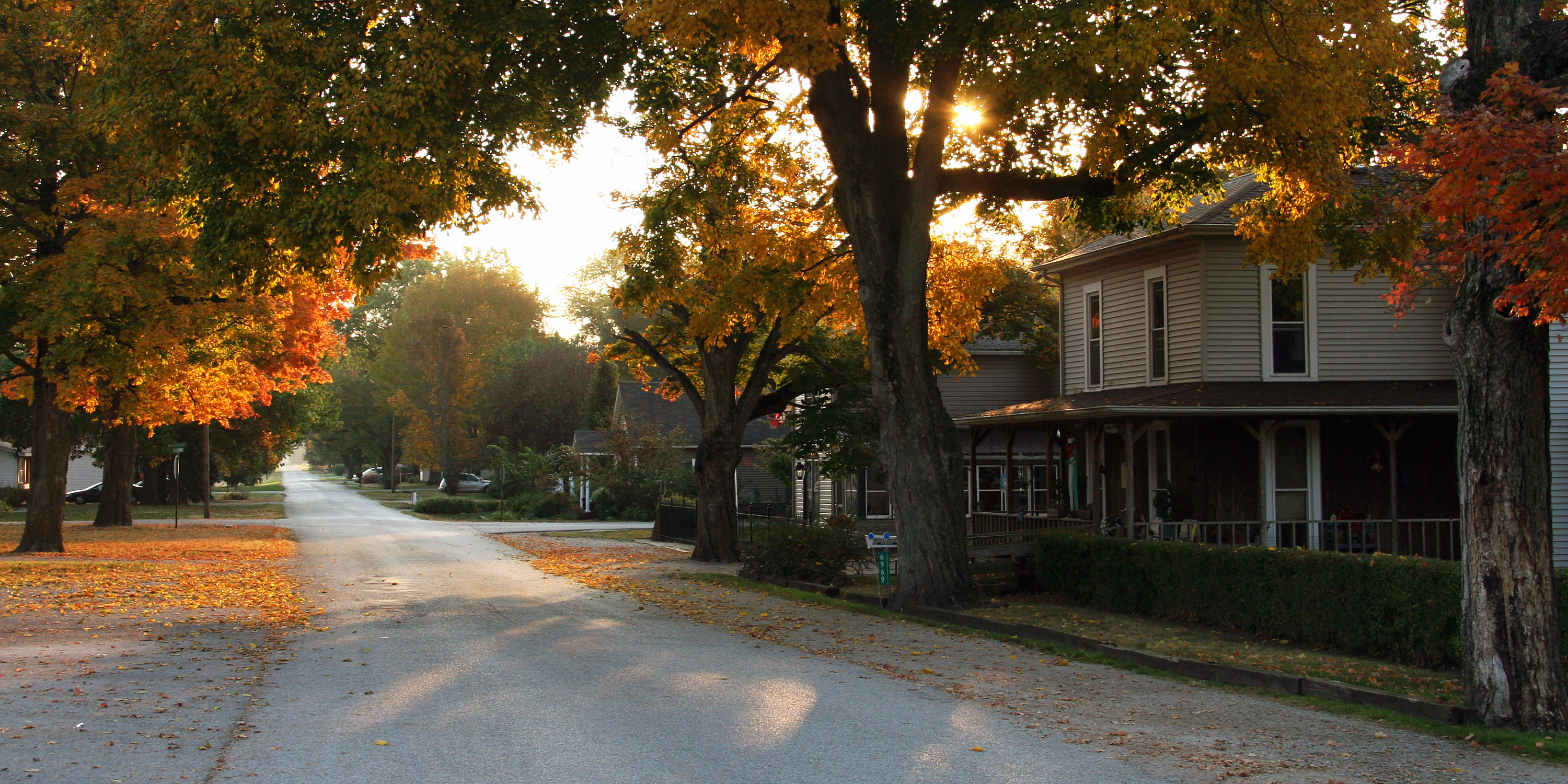
- Looking east along Jefferson Street

- Location of West Point in Tippecanoe County, Indiana.
- Coordinates: 40°20′52″N 87°02′16″W
- Country: United States
- State: Indiana
- County: Tippecanoe
- Township: Wayne

Area
  - Total: 2.77 sq mi (7.18 km^{2})
  - Land: 2.77 sq mi (7.18 km^{2})
  - Water: 0 sq mi (0.00 km^{2})
- Elevation: 646 ft (197 m)

Population (2020)
  - Total: 318
  - Density: 114.7/sq mi (44.29/km^{2})
- Time zone: UTC-5 (Eastern (EST))
  - Summer (DST): UTC-4 (EDT)
- ZIP code: 47992
- Area code: 765
- GNIS feature ID: 2583475

West Point (sometimes shown as Westpoint) is an unincorporated town and census-designated place in Wayne Township, Tippecanoe County, in the U.S. state of Indiana. As of the 2020 census, West Point had a population of 318.

The community is part of the Lafayette, Indiana Metropolitan Statistical Area.

== History ==
The town was platted in 1833 by Samuel Kiser. It was founded as Middleton, but residents changed the name of the town to West Point.

The West Point post office has been in operation since 1836.

== Geography ==
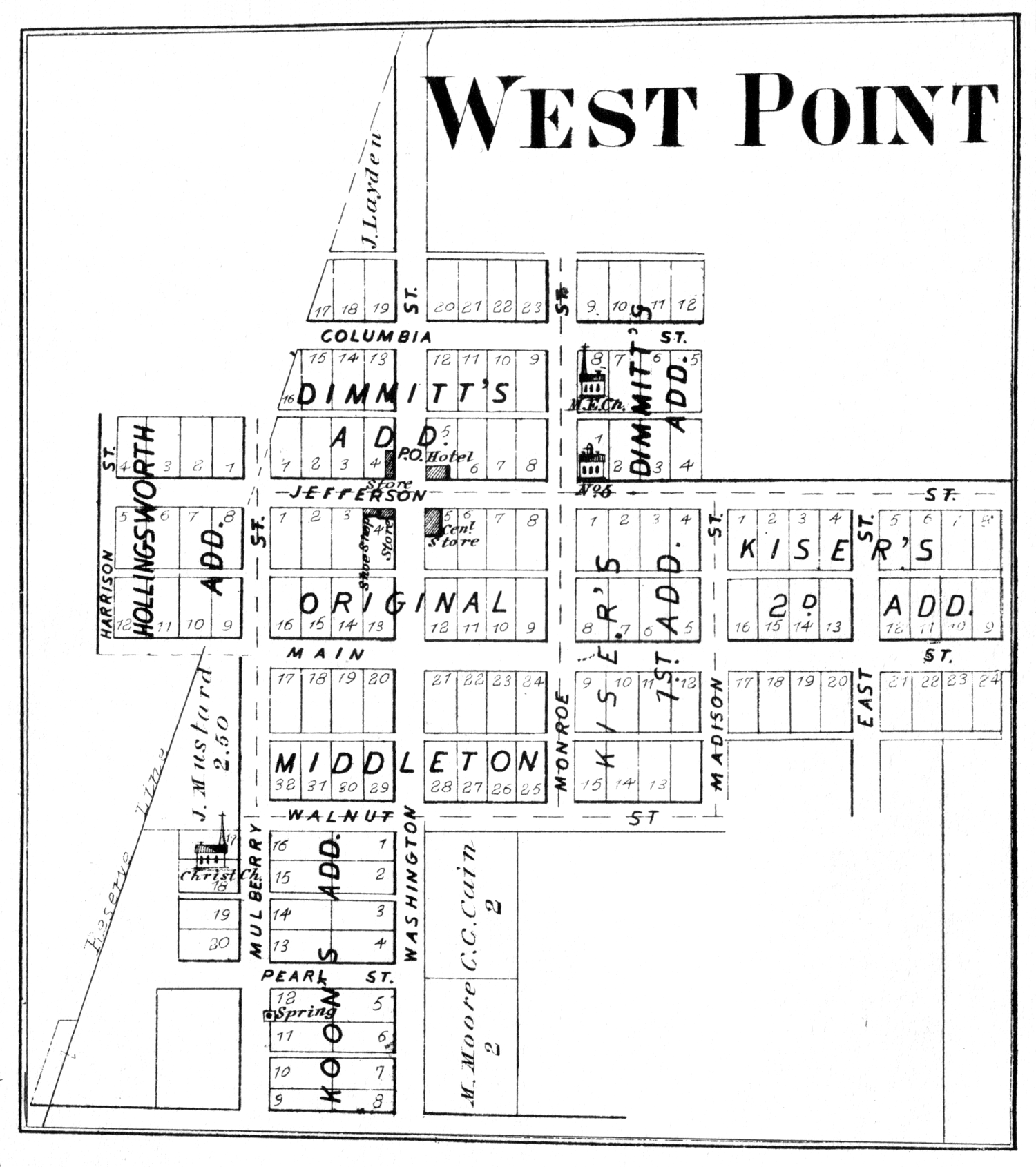
West Point in 1878.

West Point is located at 40°20′42″N 87°2′35″W (40.345036, -87.043066) along State Road 25 at an elevation of approximately 673 feet. The town is in Wayne Township and sits about a quarter of a mile north of Flint Creek which flows west to the Wabash River.

A village named Glen Hall existed on the north side of West Point in the 19th century; though still populated, the site is now generally considered part of West Point. Additionally, residents of the former town of Granville are listed using West Point addresses.

== Demographics ==
Historical population
Census	Pop.	Note	%±
2020	318		—
U.S. Decennial Census

== Economy ==
Most residents of West Point are employed outside of the main portion of the town with agriculture and businesses in Lafayette and West Lafayette. There are a number of equestrian centers and horse barns with close ties to the town.

== Religion ==
West Point is home to one church, West Point United Methodist. Another church was closed and converted to an antiques shop in the early 2010s.

There are several cemeteries and gravesites within the area. West Point Cemetery is the only one mainly located in the town. Late former WWE wrestler Ultimate Warrior is buried in this cemetery.

== Community ==
West Point has a growing level of community involvement, which primarily revolves around West Point Park (the former location of West Point High School, now demolished) and the West Point Volunteer Fire Department. Each year, the Volunteer Fire Department puts on a community fish fry to raise funds for equipment. Halloween is a special time and the entire community is involved in Light Up The Night, a designated night for costumes, food, and candy.

== Education ==
West Point residents are served by Tippecanoe School Corporation. Residents are zoned to Mintonye Elementary School, Southwestern Middle School, and McCutcheon High School.

West Point High School, home of the West Point Cadets, was consolidated into Southwestern HS in 1956, along with Shadeland, Romney, Wea & Jackson. In 1972, Southwestern was consolidated into McCutcheon High School. Elementary and middle school students report to Mintonye Elementary School and Southwestern Middle School respectively.
