= Stidham United Methodist Church =

Historic church in Indiana, United States

- U.S. National Register of Historic Places
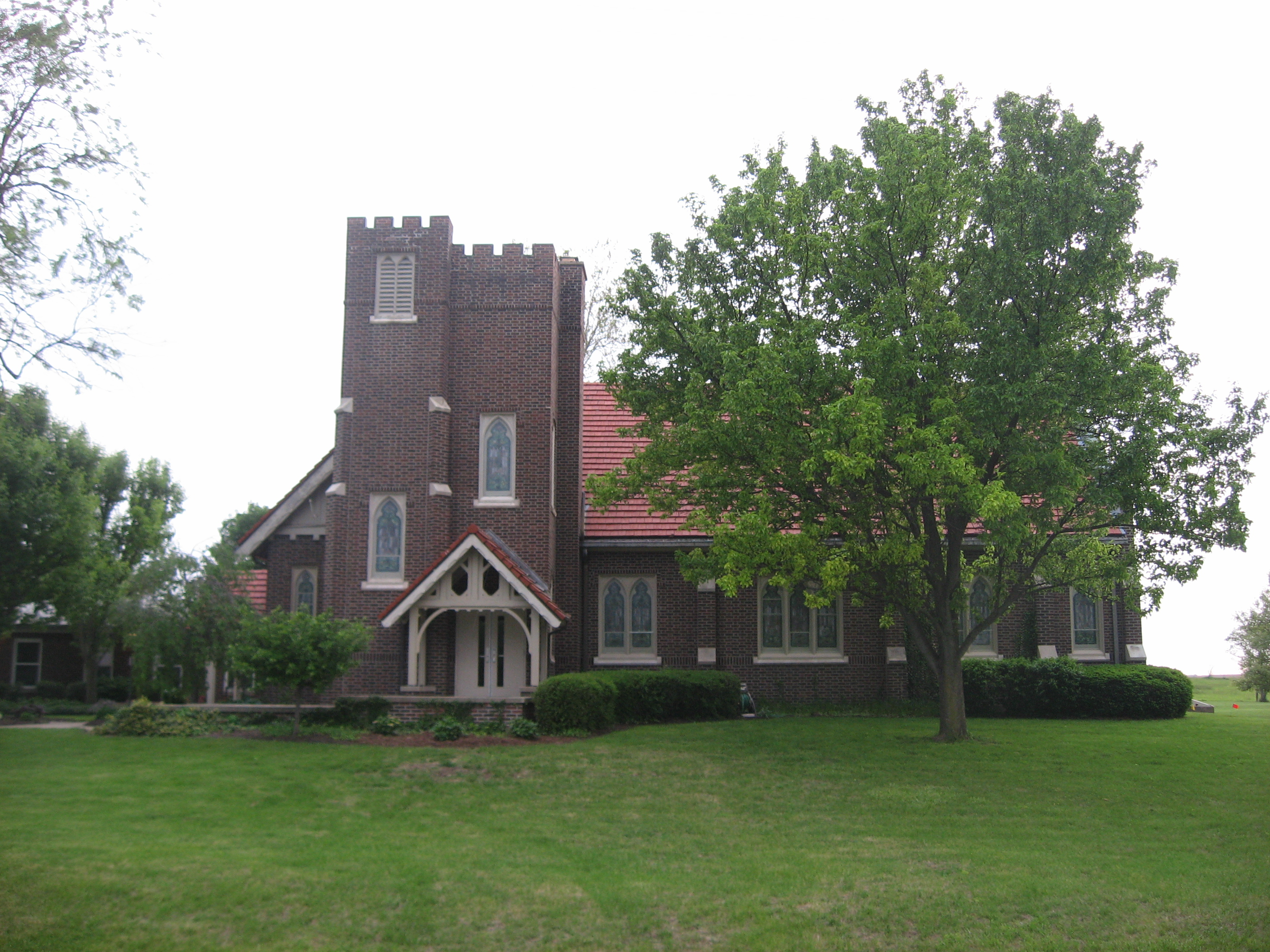
- Stidham United Methodist Church, May 2011

- Location within Tippecanoe County, Indiana Location within Indiana Location within the United States
- Location: 5300 S. 175 West, Shadeland, Indiana
- Coordinates: 40°20′30″N 86°56′17″W
- Area: less than one acre
- Built: 1912
- Architect: Nicol, Charles; Ruby, Edna
- Architectural style: Bungalow/craftsman, Gothic Revival
- NRHP reference No.: 92001651
- Added to NRHP: November 27, 1992

Stidham United Methodist Church is a historic Methodist church located at Shadeland, Indiana. It was built in 1912–1913, and is a 1 1/2-story, co-axial plan Gothic Revival style brick building topped by a steeply sloped gable roof. It features a crenellated bell tower with masonry buttresses and an American Craftsman style plain wood portico.

It was listed on the National Register of Historic Places in 1992.
