= Farmers Institute =

- U.S. National Register of Historic Places
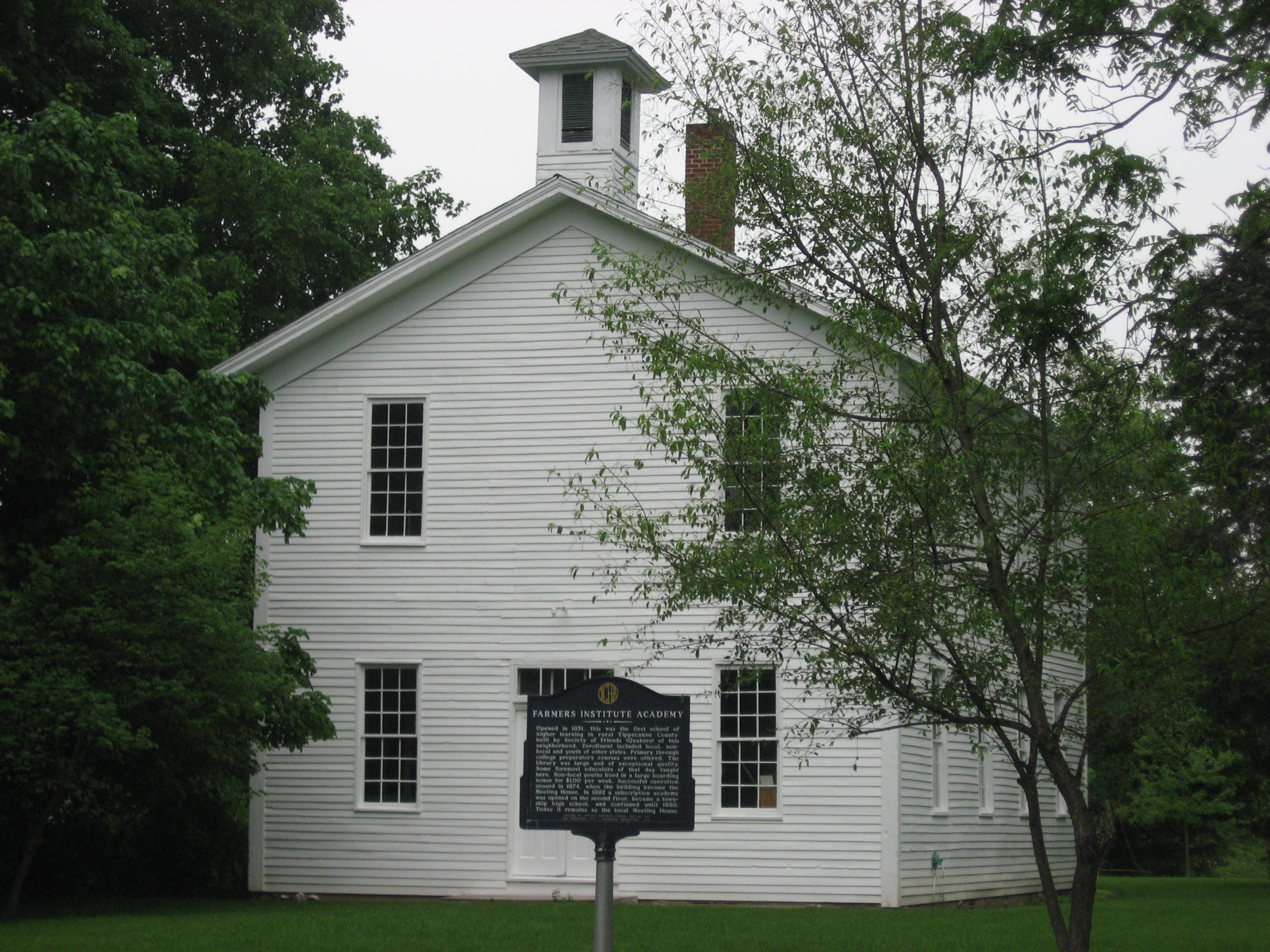
- Farmers Institute, May 2011

- Location within Tippecanoe County, Indiana Location within Indiana Location within the United States
- Location: 4626 W. CR 660 S, Shadeland, Indiana
- Coordinates: 40°19′18″N 86°59′29″W
- Area: less than one acre
- Built: 1851, 1864-1865
- Built by: Area farmers
- NRHP reference No.: 86000609 (original); 100005038 (increase)

Significant dates
- Added to NRHP: March 27, 1986
- Boundary increase: March 6, 2020

Farmers Institute is a historic school building on a small campus in Shadeland, Indiana. It was built in 1851, and expanded to its present two stories in 1864–1865. It is a two-story, rectangular, frame building with modest Greek Revival style design elements. It housed a school from its construction until 1874, and again from 1882 to 1889, during which it also housed a public library. Since then, it has exclusively housed the Farmers Institute Friends Church, a Quaker meetinghouse.

It was listed on the National Register of Historic Places in 1986, with a boundary enlargement in 2020.
