= Glenhall, Indiana =

- Unincorporated town
- Tippecanoe County's location in Indiana

- Location in Tippecanoe County
- Coordinates: 40°21′15″N 87°02′27″W
- Country: United States
- State: Indiana
- County: Tippecanoe
- Township: Wayne
- Elevation: 617 ft (188 m)
- Time zone: UTC-5 (Eastern (EST))
  - Summer (DST): UTC-4 (EDT)
- ZIP code: 47992
- Area code: 765
- GNIS feature ID: 435116

Glenhall (formerly Glen Hall) is a small unincorporated town in Wayne Township, Tippecanoe County, in the U.S. state of Indiana.

The site is often considered part of the adjoining town of West Point.

== History ==
A post office was established and named Glen Hall in 1866. It became Glenhall in 1894 and remained in operation until it was discontinued in 1904.

== Geography ==
Glenhall is located less than half a mile north of West Point. It is in Wayne Township and has an elevation of approximately 625 feet.
