= Shadeland, Indiana =

- Town
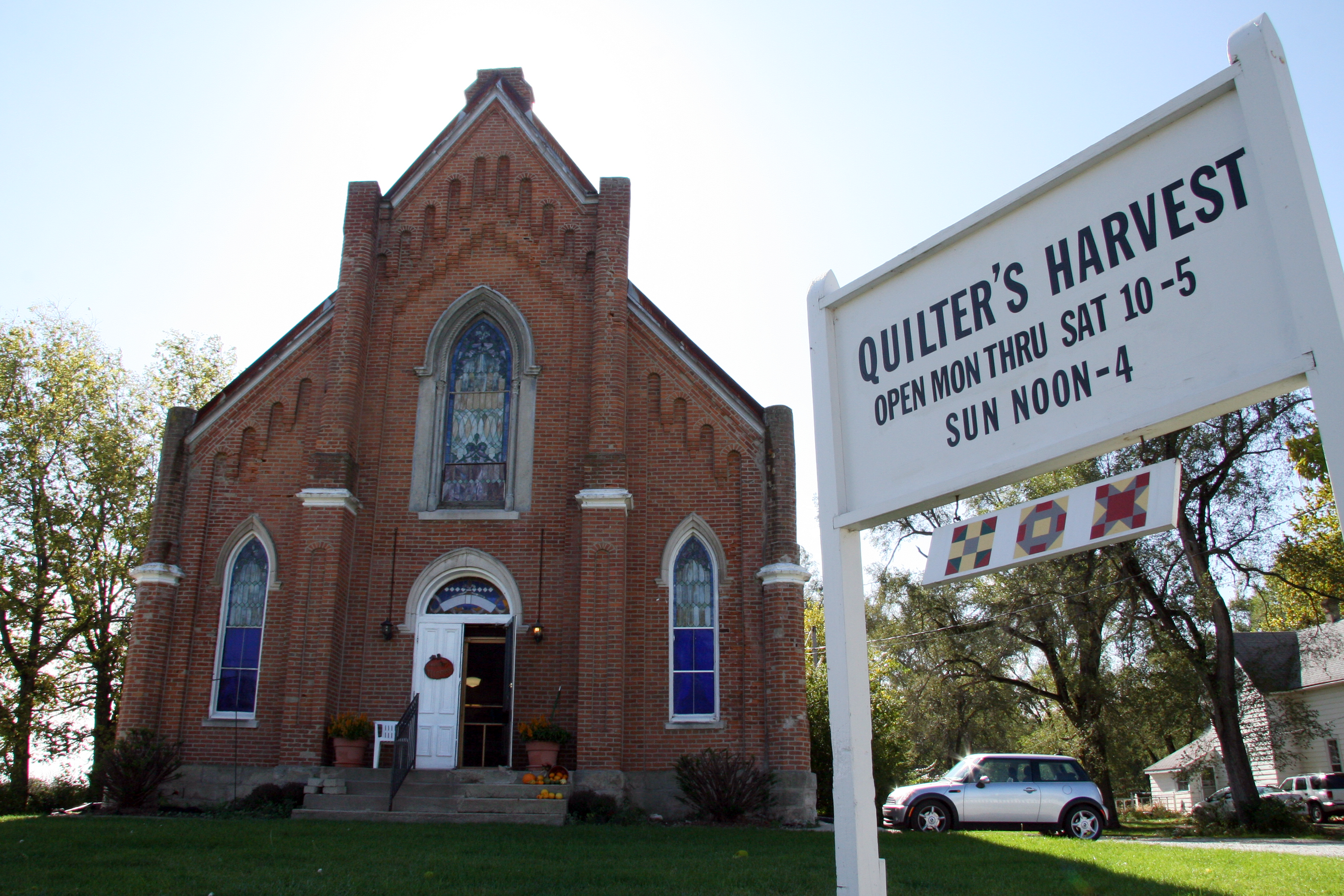
- The old church building along State Road 25 in Shadeland

- Location of Shadeland in Tippecanoe County, Indiana.
- Coordinates: 40°22′24″N 86°57′47″W
- Country: United States
- State: Indiana
- County: Tippecanoe
- Townships: Union

Area
  - Total: 27.33 sq mi (70.79 km^{2})
  - Land: 27.11 sq mi (70.21 km^{2})
  - Water: 0.22 sq mi (0.58 km^{2})
- Elevation: 679 ft (207 m)

Population (2020)
  - Total: 1,757
  - Density: 64.8/sq mi (25.02/km^{2})
- Time zone: UTC-5 (Eastern (EST))
  - Summer (DST): UTC-4 (EDT)
- ZIP code: 47909
- Area code: 765
- FIPS code: 18-68868
- GNIS feature ID: 2397651
- Website: shadeland.in.gov

Shadeland is a town in Union Township, Tippecanoe County, Indiana, United States. As of the 2020 census, Shadeland had a population of 1,757.

It is part of the Lafayette metropolitan area.

== History ==
A post office was established at Shadeland in 1887, and remained in operation until it was discontinued in 1915.

Farmers Institute and Stidham United Methodist Church are listed on the National Register of Historic Places.

== Geography ==
Indiana State Road 25 passes east and west through town.

The town is coextensive with Union Township in Tippecanoe County. The township chose to incorporate in order to prevent partial or total annexation by neighboring Lafayette. According to the 2010 census, Shadeland has a total area of 27.332 square miles (70.79 km^{2}), of which 27.1 square miles (70.19 km^{2}) (or 99.15%) is land and 0.232 square miles (0.60 km^{2}) (or 0.85%) is water.

== Demographics ==
Historical population
Census	Pop.	Note	%±
1990	1,674		—
2000	1,682		0.5%
2010	1,610		−4.3%
2020	1,757		9.1%
U.S. Decennial Census

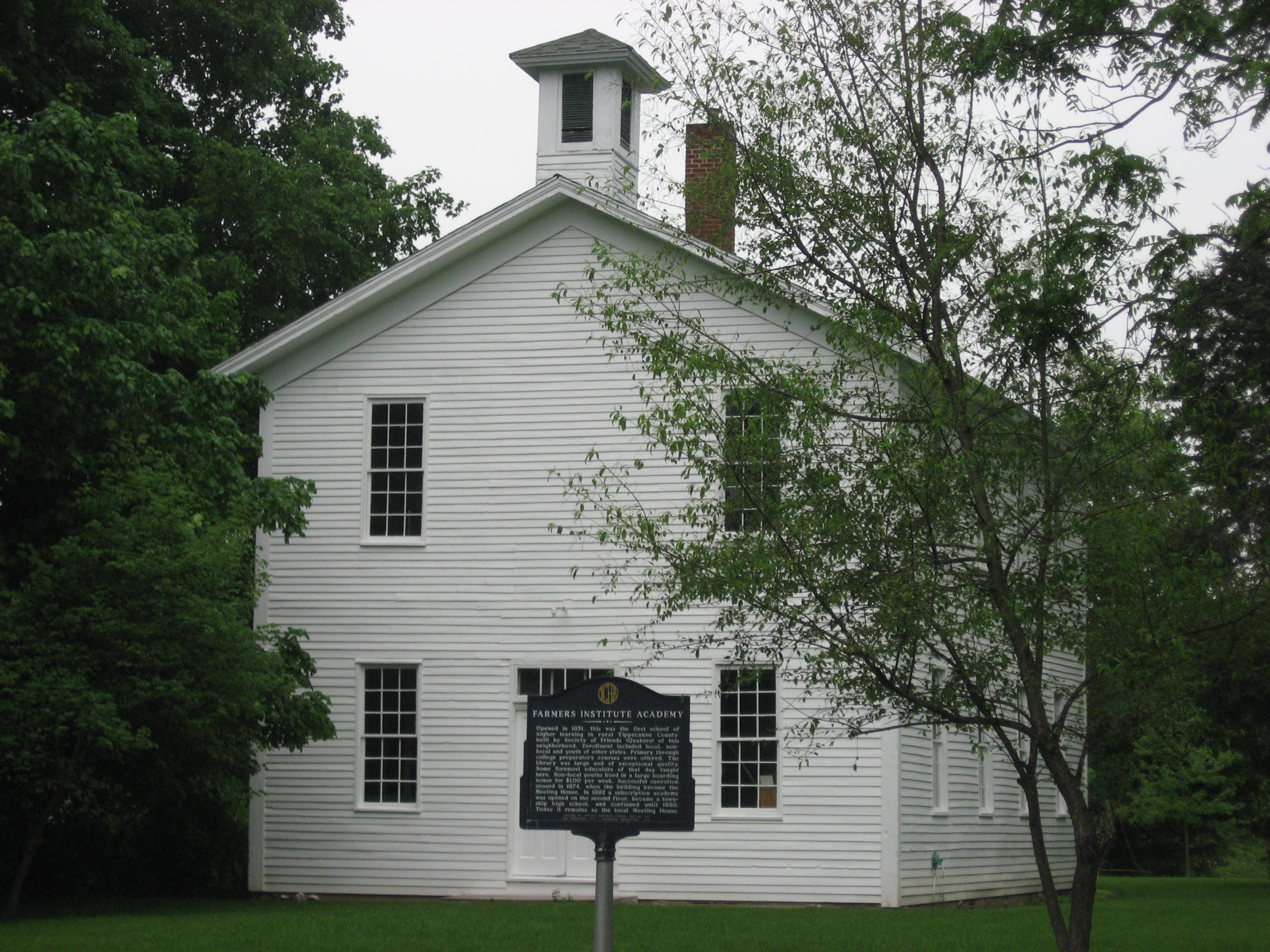
The Farmers Institute in Shadeland is listed on the National Register of Historic Places

=== 2020 census ===
As of the 2020 census, Shadeland had a population of 1,757. The median age was 44.6 years. 22.5% of residents were under the age of 18 and 18.3% of residents were 65 years of age or older. For every 100 females there were 98.1 males, and for every 100 females age 18 and over there were 99.0 males age 18 and over.

22.5% of residents lived in urban areas, while 77.5% lived in rural areas.

There were 685 households in Shadeland, of which 31.8% had children under the age of 18 living in them. Of all households, 58.0% were married-couple households, 15.9% were households with a male householder and no spouse or partner present, and 17.8% were households with a female householder and no spouse or partner present. About 19.4% of all households were made up of individuals and 10.2% had someone living alone who was 65 years of age or older.

There were 731 housing units, of which 6.3% were vacant. The homeowner vacancy rate was 0.7% and the rental vacancy rate was 8.1%.

Racial composition as of the 2020 census
Race	Number	Percent
White	1,589	90.4%
Black or African American	10	0.6%
American Indian and Alaska Native	4	0.2%
Asian	28	1.6%
Native Hawaiian and Other Pacific Islander	0	0.0%
Some other race	35	2.0%
Two or more races	91	5.2%
Hispanic or Latino (of any race)	81	4.6%

=== 2010 census ===
As of the census of 2010, there were 1,610 people, 616 households, and 476 families living in the town. The population density was 59.4 inhabitants per square mile (22.9/km^{2}). There were 675 housing units at an average density of 24.9 per square mile (9.6/km^{2}). The racial makeup of the town was 96.0% White, 0.4% African American, 0.6% Native American, 0.5% Asian, 0.1% Pacific Islander, 1.4% from other races, and 1.0% from two or more races. Hispanic or Latino of any race were 3.3% of the population.

There were 616 households, of which 30.5% had children under the age of 18 living with them, 62.2% were married couples living together, 10.1% had a female householder with no husband present, 5.0% had a male householder with no wife present, and 22.7% were non-families. 17.4% of all households were made up of individuals, and 6.8% had someone living alone who was 65 years of age or older. The average household size was 2.61 and the average family size was 2.94.

The median age in the town was 43.2 years. 21.8% of residents were under the age of 18; 8.3% were between the ages of 18 and 24; 22.2% were from 25 to 44; 33.9% were from 45 to 64; and 13.8% were 65 years of age or older. The gender makeup of the town was 49.2% male and 50.8% female.

=== 2000 census ===
As of the census of 2000, there were 1,682 people, 602 households, and 471 families living in the town. The population density was 62.0 inhabitants per square mile (23.9/km^{2}). There were 676 housing units at an average density of 24.9 per square mile (9.6/km^{2}). The racial makeup of the town was 97.44% White, 0.30% African American, 0.18% Native American, 0.77% Asian, 0.71% from other races, and 0.59% from two or more races. Hispanic or Latino of any race were 2.97% of the population.

There were 602 households, out of which 36.9% had children under the age of 18 living with them, 66.4% were married couples living together, 5.3% had a female householder with no husband present, and 21.6% were non-families. 16.9% of all households were made up of individuals, and 6.1% had someone living alone who was 65 years of age or older. The average household size was 2.79 and the average family size was 3.15.

In the town, the population was spread out, with 27.6% under the age of 18, 7.6% from 18 to 24, 27.5% from 25 to 44, 28.7% from 45 to 64, and 8.7% who were 65 years of age or older. The median age was 38 years. For every 100 females, there were 107.9 males. For every 100 females age 18 and over, there were 104.4 males.

The median income for a household in the town was $48,750, and the median income for a family was $56,875. Males had a median income of $36,810 versus $23,897 for females. The per capita income for the town was $20,631. About 1.9% of families and 3.1% of the population were below the poverty line, including 1.1% of those under age 18 and 5.4% of those age 65 or over.

== Education ==
It is in the Tippecanoe School Corporation. Residents are zoned to Mintonye Elementary School, Southwestern Middle School, and McCutcheon High School.
