= National Register of Historic Places listings in Tippecanoe County, Indiana =

Location of Tippecanoe County in Indiana

This is a list of the National Register of Historic Places listings in Tippecanoe County, Indiana.

This is intended to be a complete list of the properties and districts on the National Register of Historic Places in Tippecanoe County, Indiana, United States. Latitude and longitude coordinates are provided for many National Register properties and districts; these locations may be seen together in a map.

There are 51 properties and districts listed on the National Register in the county, including three National Historic Landmarks.

Properties and districts located in incorporated areas display the name of the municipality, while properties and districts in unincorporated areas display the name of their civil township. Properties and districts split between multiple jurisdictions display the names of all jurisdictions.

This National Park Service list is complete through NPS recent listings posted December 19, 2025.

== Current listings ==
	Name on the Register	Image	Date listed	Location	City or town	Description
1	Alpha Tau Omega Fraternity House	Alpha Tau Omega Fraternity House	March 20, 2002 (#02000197)	314 Russell St. 40°25′39″N 86°55′07″W	West Lafayette	
2	Jesse Andrew House	Jesse Andrew House	August 11, 1983 (#83000103)	123 Andrew Pl. 40°25′28″N 86°54′34″W	West Lafayette	
3	Archeological Sites 12T59 and 12T530		September 14, 2015 (#15000599)	Southern side of Indian Mound Dr. 40°31′23″N 86°47′30″W	Tippecanoe Township	
4	Judge Cyrus Ball House	Judge Cyrus Ball House	May 3, 1984 (#84001649)	402 S. 9th St. 40°24′49″N 86°53′12″W	Lafayette	
5	Battle Ground Historic District	Battle Ground Historic District	July 23, 1985 (#85001639)	Roughly bounded by Burnett Creek, Sherman Dr., and an open ridge on the southeast 40°30′35″N 86°50′21″W	Battle Ground	
6	Big Four Depot	Big Four Depot	June 22, 2003 (#03000548)	200 N. 2nd St. 40°25′07″N 86°53′44″W	Lafayette	
7	Cairo Skywatch Tower	Cairo Skywatch Tower	March 21, 2002 (#02000202)	County Road 850N at County Road 100W at Cairo; 40°32′26″N 86°55′30″W	Tippecanoe Township	
8	Centennial Neighborhood District	Centennial Neighborhood District	June 16, 1983 (#83003443)	Roughly bounded by Union, 3rd, 4th, Ferry, and 9th Sts. 40°25′21″N 86°53′25″W	Lafayette	
9	Chauncey-Stadium Avenues Historic District	Chauncey-Stadium Avenues Historic District	December 20, 2002 (#02001558)	Roughly bounded by Meridian, Lincoln, River Rd., Fowler, Quincy, Northwestern, and Allen Sts. 40°25′52″N 86°54′22″W	West Lafayette	
10	John E. and Catherine E. Christian House	John E. and Catherine E. Christian House	June 16, 1992 (#92000679)	1301 Woodland Ave. 40°26′18″N 86°54′59″W	West Lafayette	
11	Curtis-Grace House	Curtis-Grace House	April 10, 2012 (#12000190)	2175 Tecumseh Park Ln. 40°26′50″N 86°54′27″W	West Lafayette	
12	Dayton Historic District	Dayton Historic District	March 26, 2003 (#03000142)	Roughly bounded by Walnut, Harrison, and Pennsylvania Sts. 40°22′35″N 86°46′03″W	Dayton	
13	Downtown Lafayette Historic District	Downtown Lafayette Historic District	November 28, 1980 (#80000067)	Roughly bounded by 2nd, Ferry, 6th, and South Sts. 40°25′08″N 86°53′33″W	Lafayette	
14	Ellsworth Historic District	Ellsworth Historic District	December 30, 1986 (#86003501)	Roughly bounded by Columbia, the Norfolk Southern railroad tracks, Alabama, 7th, South, and 6th Sts. 40°24′55″N 86°53′20″W	Lafayette	
15	Ely Homestead	Ely Homestead	October 8, 1976 (#76000036)	4106 E. 200N, northeast of Lafayette; 40°26′53″N 86°49′37″W	Fairfield Township	
16	Enterprise Hotel	Enterprise Hotel	June 21, 1984 (#84001650)	1015 Main St. 40°25′08″N 86°53′06″W	Lafayette	
17	Falley Home	Falley Home	July 15, 1982 (#82000078)	601 New York St. 40°24′52″N 86°53′24″W	Lafayette	
18	Farmers Institute	Farmers Institute	March 27, 1986 (#86000609)	4626 W. County Road 660S; also 4636 West 660 South; 40°19′18″N 86°59′29″W	Shadeland	Second address represents a boundary increase approved March 6, 2020
19	Fort Ouiatenon	Fort Ouiatenon	February 16, 1970 (#70000008)	Along River Rd. and the Wabash River, west of the Purdue University Airport; 40°24′23″N 86°57′50″W	Wabash Township	Designated a National Historic Landmark in 2021.
20	Moses Fowler House	Moses Fowler House	August 5, 1971 (#71000009)	Corner of 10th and South Sts. 40°25′00″N 86°53′10″W	Lafayette	
21	Greenbush Cemetery		May 26, 2021 (#100006569)	1408 North 12th St. 40°25′53″N 86°53′04″W	Lafayette	
22	Happy Hollow Heights Historic District	Happy Hollow Heights Historic District	December 15, 2015 (#15000891)	1821 and 1809 Happy Hollow Rd. and all houses on Laurel, Hollowood, Fearnleaf, and Sumac Drs. 40°26′33″N 86°54′00″W	West Lafayette	
23	Hershey House	Hershey House	November 28, 1978 (#78000054)	East of Lafayette on East Rd. 40°26′42″N 86°45′59″W	Perry Township	
24	Highland Park Neighborhood Historic District	Highland Park Neighborhood Historic District	March 14, 1996 (#96000270)	Roughly bounded by Kossuth St., S. 9th St., Cherokee Ave., and 4th St. 40°24′22″N 86°53′21″W	Lafayette	
25	Hills and Dales Historic District	Hills and Dales Historic District	June 27, 2002 (#02000689)	Roughly bounded by Northwestern Ave., Meridian St., Hillcrest Rd., and Grant St. 40°26′07″N 86°54′49″W	West Lafayette	
26	David and Harriet Hopwood House		November 15, 2024 (#100011039)	602 N. Fifth Street; 40°25′22″N 86°53′31″W	Lafayette	
27	Indian Trail Road-Belle River Bridge	Indian Trail Road-Belle River Bridge	January 28, 2000 (#00000012)	Steel Bridge Research, Inspection, Training and Engineering Center, S. Sharon Chapel Rd. 40°24′31″N 86°57′02″W	Wabash Township	Replaced in 2008, this bridge was moved from its original location and as of 2015 resides at Purdue University's Steel Bridge Research, Inspection, Training and Engineering Center.
28	Indiana State Soldiers Home Historic District	Indiana State Soldiers Home Historic District	January 2, 1974 (#74000034)	North of Lafayette off State Road 43; 40°28′08″N 86°53′15″W	Tippecanoe and Wabash Townships	
29	Jefferson Historic District	Jefferson Historic District	September 16, 2001 (#01000976)	Roughly bounded by 9th, Erie, Elizabeth, and Ferry Sts. 40°25′19″N 86°53′04″W	Lafayette	
30	Marian Apartments	Marian Apartments	June 30, 1983 (#83000150)	615 North St. 40°25′15″N 86°53′23″W	Lafayette	
31	Mars Theatre	Mars Theatre	January 26, 1981 (#81000030)	111 N. 6th St. 40°25′06″N 86°53′25″W	Lafayette	
32	Levi and Lucy Morehouse Farm	Levi and Lucy Morehouse Farm	December 19, 2012 (#12001065)	5038 Morehouse Rd., northwest of West Lafayette; 40°29′27″N 86°57′26″W	Wabash Township	
33	Morton School	Morton School	September 9, 1999 (#99001113)	222 N. Chauncey Ave. 40°25′31″N 86°54′23″W	West Lafayette	
34	Ninth Street Hill Neighborhood Historic District	Ninth Street Hill Neighborhood Historic District	April 14, 1997 (#97000303)	Roughly 9th St. from South to Kossuth Sts. and State St. from 9th to Kossuth Sts. 40°24′48″N 86°53′09″W	Lafayette	
35	Park Mary Historic District	Park Mary Historic District	June 15, 2001 (#01000617)	Roughly bounded by Union, Hartford, N. 6th, and N. 14th Sts. 40°25′33″N 86°53′01″W	Lafayette	
36	Oliver Webster Jr. and Catherine Peirce House		December 3, 2018 (#100003190)	538 S. 7th St. 40°24′38″N 86°53′18″W	Lafayette	
37	Perrin Historic District	Perrin Historic District	September 10, 1979 (#79000045)	Roughly bounded by Murdock Park, Sheridan Rd., Columbia, Main, and Union Sts. 40°25′14″N 86°52′47″W	Lafayette	
38	James Pierce Jr. House	James Pierce Jr. House	June 17, 1982 (#82000079)	4624 N. 140W, north of West Lafayette; 40°29′06″N 86°55′56″W	Wabash Township	
39	William Potter House	William Potter House	January 6, 1983 (#83000104)	915 Columbia St. 40°25′05″N 86°53′08″W	Lafayette	
40	St. John's Episcopal Church	St. John's Episcopal Church	September 20, 1978 (#78000055)	315 N. 6th St. 40°25′13″N 86°53′25″W	Lafayette	
41	St. Mary Historic District	St. Mary Historic District	June 14, 2001 (#01000622)	Roughly bounded by Main, South, 10th, and 14th Sts. 40°25′01″N 86°52′51″W	Lafayette	
42	Scott Street Pavilion	Scott Street Pavilion	September 27, 1984 (#84001656)	Columbian Park; 40°24′54″N 86°52′18″W	Lafayette	
43	Spring Vale Cemetery		August 25, 2020 (#100005512)	2580 Schuyler Avenue; 40°26′54″N 86°51′38″W	Lafayette	
44	Stidham United Methodist Church	Stidham United Methodist Church	November 27, 1992 (#92001651)	5300 S. 175W; 40°20′30″N 86°56′17″W	Shadeland	
45	Temple Israel	Temple Israel	February 19, 1982 (#82000080)	17 S. 7th St. 40°25′00″N 86°53′16″W	Lafayette	
46	Tippecanoe Battlefield	Tippecanoe Battlefield	October 15, 1966 (#66000013)	7 miles northeast of Lafayette on State Road 25; 40°28′08″N 86°50′43″W	Battle Ground and Tippecanoe Township	
47	Tippecanoe County Courthouse	Tippecanoe County Courthouse	October 31, 1972 (#72000013)	Public Square; 40°25′05″N 86°53′20″W	Lafayette	
48	Upper Main Street Historic District	Upper Main Street Historic District	May 24, 1990 (#90000814)	Roughly bounded by Ferry St., 6th St., Columbia St., and the Norfolk Southern railroad tracks 40°25′09″N 86°53′14″W	Lafayette	
49	The Varsity	The Varsity	December 7, 2001 (#01001342)	101 Andrew Place; 40°25′27″N 86°54′33″W	West Lafayette	
50	Waldron-Beck House and Carriage House	Waldron-Beck House and Carriage House	February 9, 1984 (#84001661)	829 N. 21st St. 40°25′33″N 86°52′21″W	Lafayette	
51	James H. Ward House	James H. Ward House	April 7, 1988 (#88000385)	1116 Columbia St. 40°25′06″N 86°53′02″W	Lafayette	

== Former listings ==
	Name on the Register	Image	Date listed	Date removed	Location	City or town	Description
1	West Lafayette Baptist Church		September 6, 1979 (#79000046)	September 29, 1984	123 N. Chauncey St.	West Lafayette	

== See also ==
- List of National Historic Landmarks in Indiana
- National Register of Historic Places listings in Indiana
- Listings in neighboring counties: Benton, Carroll, Clinton, Fountain, Montgomery, Warren, White
- List of Indiana state historical markers in Tippecanoe County
