= List of Indiana state historical markers in Tippecanoe County =

Location of Tippecanoe County in Indiana

This is a list of the Indiana state historical markers in Tippecanoe County.

This is intended to be a complete list of the official state historical markers placed in Tippecanoe County, Indiana, United States by the Indiana Historical Bureau. The locations of the historical markers and their latitude and longitude coordinates are included below when available, along with their names, years of placement, and topics as recorded by the Historical Bureau. There are 10 historical markers located in Tippecanoe County.

== Historical markers ==
| Marker title | Image | Year placed | Location | Topics |
|---|---|---|---|---|
| Tippecanoe Battleground 2.1 Miles East (Marker no longer standing) | | 1947 | Western side of State Road 43 at the junction of Prophet's Rock Road and Burnetts Road, 0.2 miles south of Exit 178 from Interstate 65, near Battle Ground; 40°29′30″N 86°52′12″W | American Indian/Native American, Military, Early Settlement and Exploration |
| Tecumseh Trail | | 1953 | Along State Road 43, 3.8 miles north of its junction with State Street at a roadside park adjacent to the Wabash River, north of West Lafayette; 40°28′24″N 86°53′3″W | American Indian/Native American, Transportation |
| The Wabash River | | 1973 | Along State Road 43 by Mascouten Park and a boat ramp adjacent to the Wabash River, 1.1 miles north of the intersection of State Road 43 with State Street in West Lafayette; 40°26′10″N 86°53′49″W | Nature and Natural Disasters, American Indian/Native American, Transportation, Military |
| Perrin Historic District | | 1992 | 205 Perrin Street, east of downtown Lafayette; 40°25′9″N 86°52′57″W | Historic District, Neighborhoods, and Towns, Buildings and Architecture |
| Cairo Skywatch Tower | | 1995 | Junction of County Roads 850N and 100W in Memorial Park at Cairo; 40°32′26.7″N 86°55′26.4″W | Military, Government Institutions |
| Highland Park | | 1997 | Between Highland and Pontiac Avenues along Miami Street in a triangle park, south of downtown Lafayette; 40°24′27″N 86°53′17″W | Historic District, Neighborhoods, and Towns, Buildings and Architecture |
| Highland Park | | 1997 | Junction of Wea and Cherokee Avenues in Lafayette; 40°24′17″N 86°53′20.4″W | Historic District, Neighborhoods, and Towns, Buildings and Architecture |
| Centennial Historic District | | 1998 | Junction of 6th and Brown Streets at the entrance to Centennial Park in Lafayette; 40°25′19″N 86°53′26″W | Historic District, Neighborhoods, and Towns, Transportation, Buildings and Architecture |
| Fort Ouiatenon | | 1998 | Adjacent to the blockhouse in Fort Ouiatenon Historic Park, located along S. River Road about 4 miles southwest of West Lafayette; 40°24′23″N 86°57′49″W | Military, American Indian/Native American |
| Ninth Street Hill Neighborhood Historic District | | 2001 | 904 State Street in Lafayette; 40°24′46.6″N 86°53′11.4″W | Historic District, Neighborhoods, and Towns, Buildings and Architecture |
| Helen M Gougar | | 2014 | 914 Columbia St., Lafayette; 40°25′06″N 86°53′09″W | Women's Suffrage, Right to Vote, Women's History |

== See also ==
- List of Indiana state historical markers
- National Register of Historic Places listings in Tippecanoe County, Indiana
