= Park Mary Historic District =

Historic district in Indiana, United States

- U.S. National Register of Historic Places
- U.S. Historic district
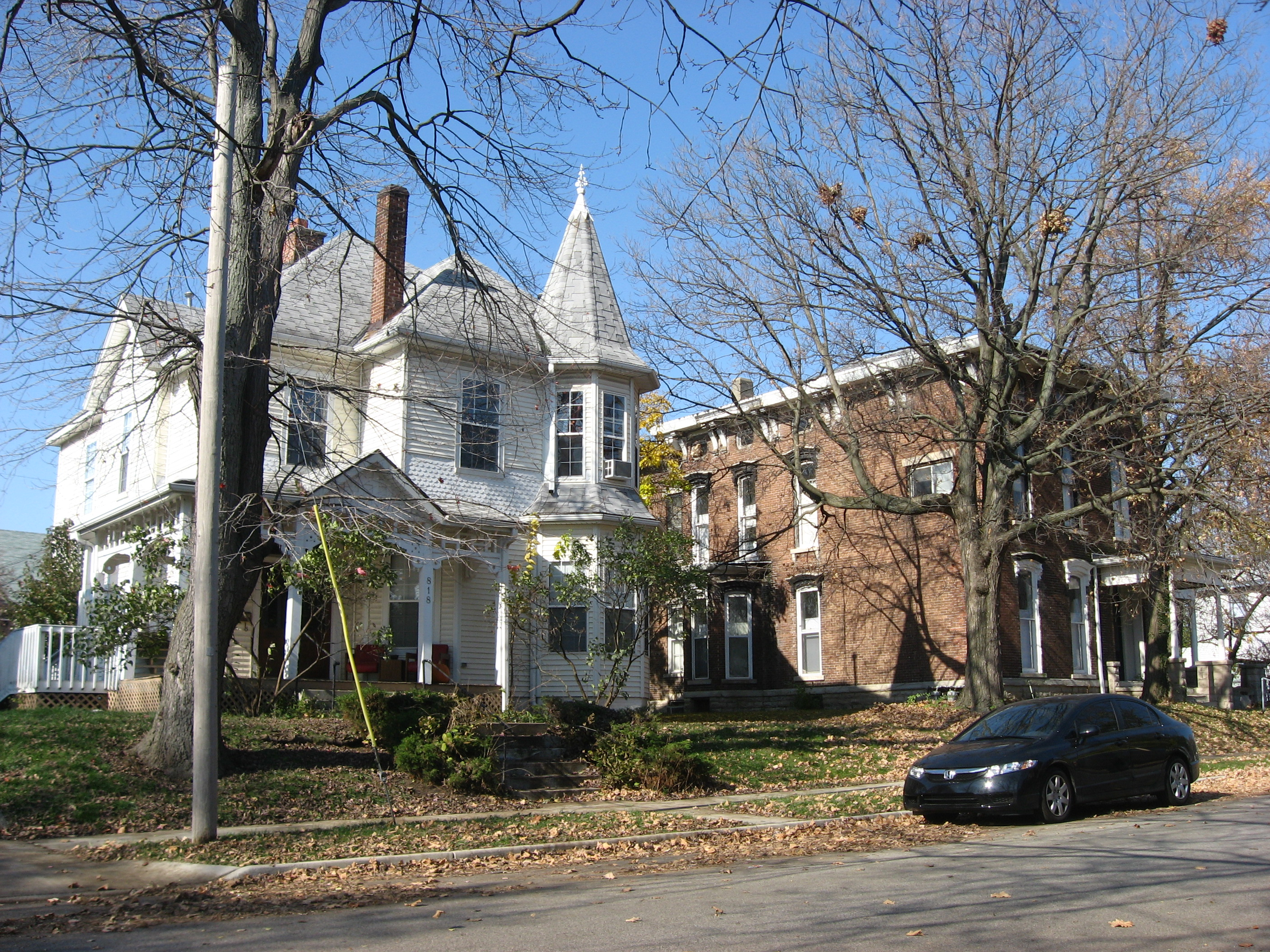
- Park Mary Historic District, November 2009

- Location within Tippecanoe County, Indiana Location within Indiana Location within the United States
- Location: Roughly bounded by Union, Hartford, N. 6th, and N. 14th Sts., Lafayette, Indiana
- Coordinates: 40°25′33″N 86°53′01″W
- Area: 31.7 acres (12.8 ha)
- Architect: Scholar, Walter
- Architectural style: Italianate, Queen Anne, et al.
- NRHP reference No.: 01000617
- Added to NRHP: June 15, 2001

Park Mary Historic District is a national historic district located at Lafayette, Indiana. The district encompasses 106 contributing buildings and one contributing structure in a predominantly residential section of Lafayette. It developed between about 1853 and 1950 and includes representative examples of Italianate, Queen Anne, and Bungalow / American Craftsman style architecture. Notable contributing buildings include the Thomas Hull House (1870), Fry House (1873), Perrin House (1868), Fletmeyer House (1881), Keipner House (1885), Behm House (1858), Greagor House (1873), Ulrick House, John and William Levering House (1858), Sawyer House (1868), Lafayette Christian Reformed Church (1929), Lincoln School (1923), and Lafayette Armory (1927).

It was listed on the National Register of Historic Places in 2001.

== See also ==
- Centennial Neighborhood District
- Downtown Lafayette Historic District
- Ellsworth Historic District
- Highland Park Neighborhood Historic District
- Jefferson Historic District
- Ninth Street Hill Neighborhood Historic District
- Perrin Historic District
- St. Mary Historic District
- Upper Main Street Historic District
