= Cleveland, Columbus, Cincinnati and Indianapolis Railway =

Railroad in the United States (1868–1889)

Overview
- Headquarters: Cleveland, Ohio
- Locale: Indiana and Ohio
- Dates of operation: 1868–1889
- Successor: Cleveland, Cincinnati, Chicago and St. Louis Railroad

Technical
- Track gauge: 4 ft 8 1/2 in (1,435 mm) standard gauge

The Cleveland, Columbus, Cincinnati and Indianapolis Railway (CCC&I) was formed from the merger of the Cleveland, Columbus and Cincinnati Railroad (CC&C) with the Bellefontaine Railway in 1868. The Bellefontaine had been formed by a merger of the Bellefontaine and Indiana Railroad and the Indianapolis, Pittsburgh and Cleveland Railroad in 1864. Two key figures in its construction were Cyrus Ball and Albert S. White.

== Genealogy ==
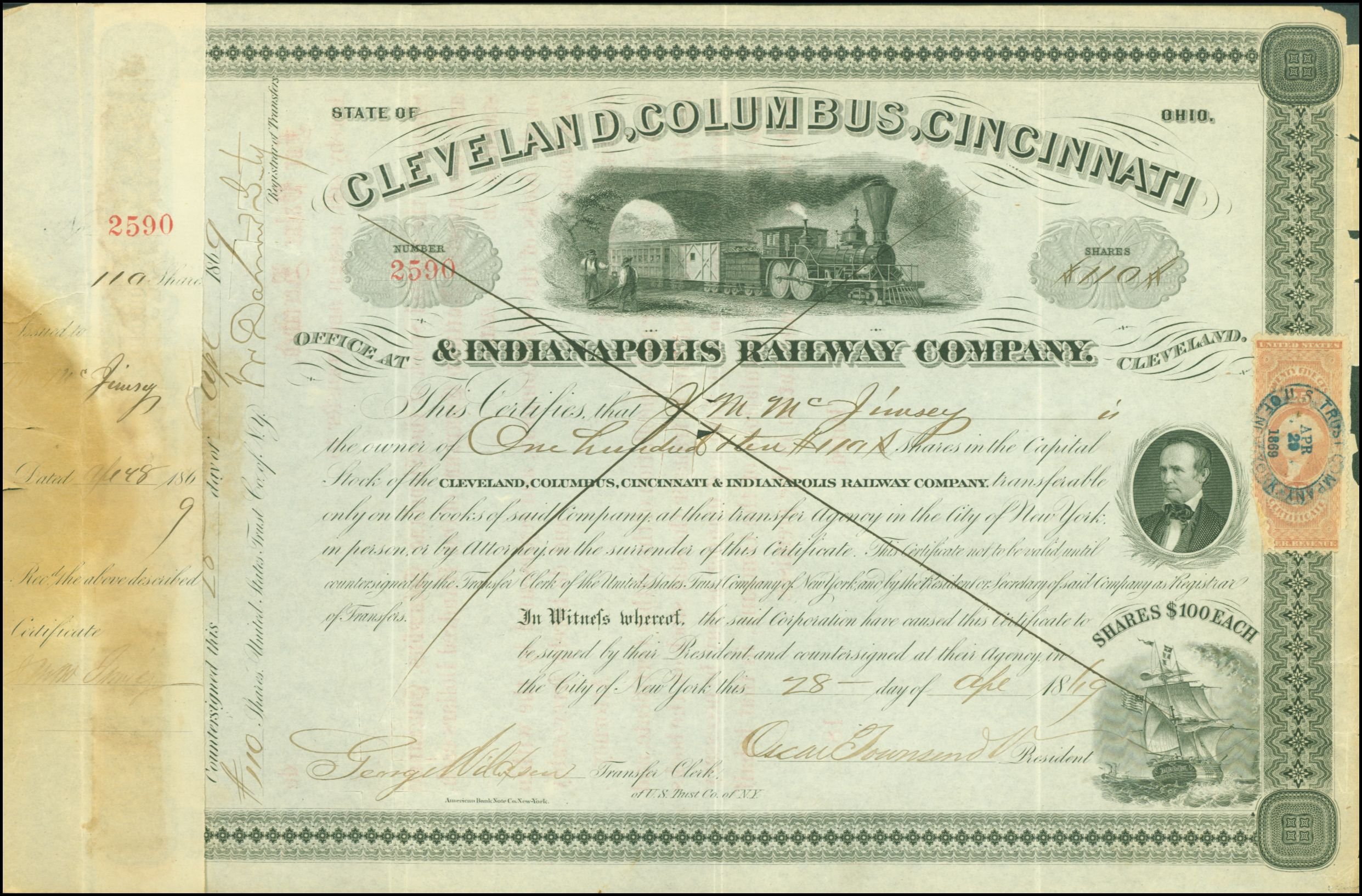
Share of the Cleveland, Columbus, Cincinnati & Indianapolis Railway Company, issued April 28, 1869

The predecessor railroads the CCC&I were:

- Cleveland, Columbus, Cincinnati and Indianapolis Railway
  - Bellefontaine Railroad (1868)
    - Bellefontaine and Indiana Railroad (1864)
    - Indianapolis, Pittsburgh and Cleveland Railroad (1864)
      - Indianapolis and Bellefontaine Railroad (1855)
  - Cleveland, Columbus and Cincinnati Railroad (1868)
    - Springfield, Mt. Vernon and Pittsburgh Railroad (1862)

== History ==
The CCC&I came into existence on May 16, 1868, as a merger of the Bellefontaine Railroad and the Cleveland, Columbus and Cincinnati Railroad. At its inception it had 83 locomotives, 47 of which came from the CC&C and 36 from the Bellefontaine. It immediately began to build its own locomotives at its shops in Cleveland and Galion, Ohio, but also continued to buy engines from outside vendors.

After its formation, the CCC&I sought to make a connection to Cincinnati. This connection had never been realized by its predecessor line, the Cleveland Columbus and Cincinnati Railroad, which ran trains only between Cleveland and Columbus, Ohio. In 1871, the CCC&I made agreements to operate the Cincinnati and Springfield Railroad and its 16 engines between Cincinnati and Dayton, Ohio. It also leased the Cincinnati, Sandusky and Cleveland Railroad between Dayton and Springfield, Ohio, finally providing a through route from Cleveland through Columbus to Cincinnati.

On July 23, 1882, the CCC&I acquired the Indianapolis & St. Louis Railroad (I&SL) in a judicial sale. The St. Louis, Alton & Terre Haute railroad, which the I&SL had leased, was included in the sale. The I&SL continued to be operated under its own name after the acquisition.

On July 1, 1889, the CCC&I merged with lines in Indiana and Illinois to form the Cleveland, Cincinnati, Chicago and St. Louis Railway, known as the Big Four Route. At the time of the merger, the CCC&I had 161 locomotives and the I&SL had 47. The Big Four eventually became a part of the New York Central Railroad.

== See also ==
- Union Station (Columbus)

== Resources ==
- Steiner, Rowlee. "A Review of Columbus Railroads", 1952, unpublished 125 page manuscript available from the library of the Ohio Historical Society, 1982 Velma Drive, Columbus, Ohio 43211
