= Ellsworth Historic District =

Historic district in Indiana, United States

- U.S. National Register of Historic Places
- U.S. Historic district
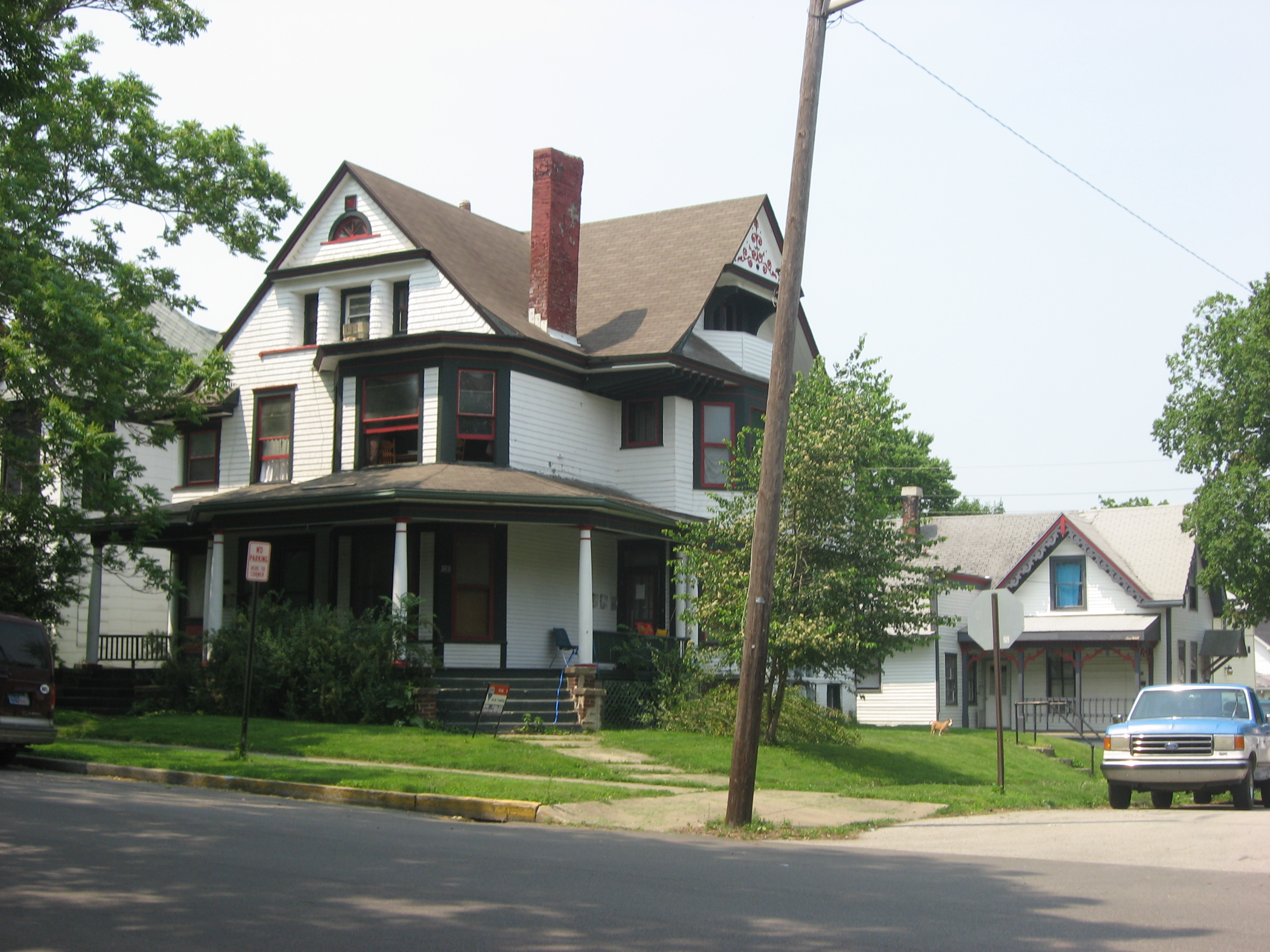
- Sixth and New York in Lafayette, June 2011

- Location within Tippecanoe County, Indiana Location within Indiana Location within the United States
- Location: Roughly bounded by Columbia, Norfolk & Western RR tracks, Alabama, Seventh, South and Sixth Sts., Lafayette, Indiana
- Coordinates: 40°24′55″N 86°53′20″W
- Area: 34 acres (14 ha)
- Architectural style: Bungalow/craftsman, Late Victorian
- NRHP reference No.: 86003501
- Added to NRHP: December 30, 1986

Ellsworth Historic District, also known as Ellsworth Addition, is a national historic district located at Lafayette, Indiana. The district encompasses 144 contributing buildings, one contributing site, and four contributing structures in a predominantly residential section of Lafayette. It developed between about 1844 and 1936 and includes representative examples of Italianate, Second Empire, Queen Anne, and Bungalow / American Craftsman style architecture. Located in the district are the separately listed Falley Home, Moses Fowler House, and Temple Israel. Other notable buildings include the Second Presbyterian Church (1894–1895), Alexander House (c. 1880), Ball Brothers House (c. 1845), Falley Townhouse (c. 1892), Home Block (c. 1870), Annie Fowler House (c. 1870), and Duplex Townhouse (c. 1890).

It was listed on the National Register of Historic Places in 1986.

== See also ==
- Centennial Neighborhood District
- Downtown Lafayette Historic District
- Highland Park Neighborhood Historic District
- Jefferson Historic District
- Ninth Street Hill Neighborhood Historic District
- Park Mary Historic District
- Park Mary Historic District
- Perrin Historic District
- St. Mary Historic District
- Upper Main Street Historic District
