= Pottlitzer House =

Historic house in Indiana, United States

Coordinates: 40°25′18.1″N 86°53′15.9″W

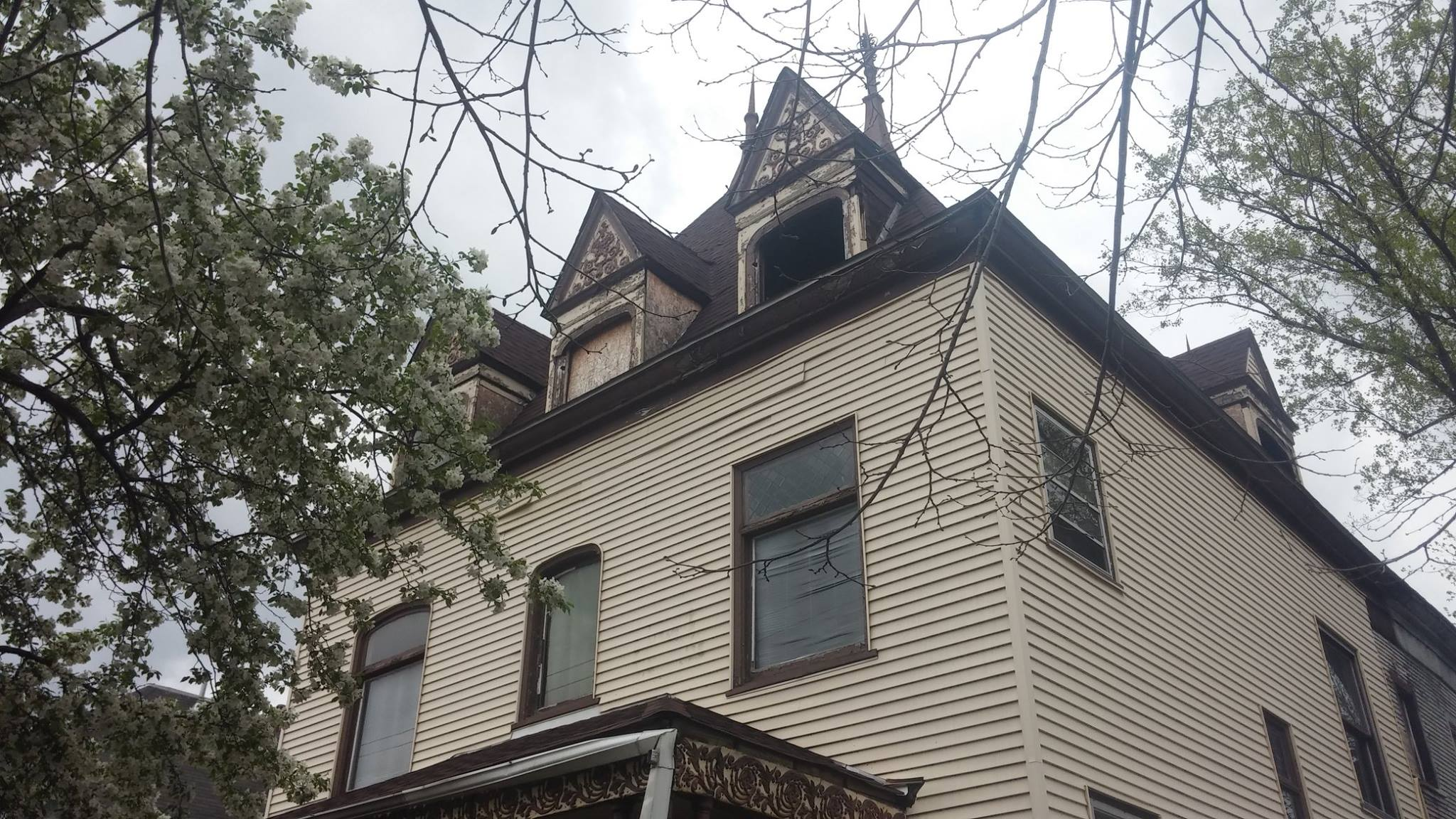
Historic Pottlitzer House

The Pottlitzer House at 801 Brown St. is in the historic Centennial Neighborhood in Lafayette, Indiana. This Pottlitzer house was constructed in 1893 by Leo and Minnie Pottlitzer. It is a mixture of Colonial Revival, Chateau and Queen Anne styles. When constructed it cost $9000, about $260,000 in today's value. The finials and oversized gables with low relief sculptures are indicative of the eclectic style popular in the late 19th century. The most notable feature, the tall spires on the roof, are the only known extant residential example of this style in Lafayette. The Pottlitzer House caught on fire in early 2015, severely damaging the rear of the structure.
