= Saint James Lutheran Church and School (Lafayette, Indiana) =

Historic church in Indiana, United States

St. James Lutheran Church & School
- Saint James Lutheran Church and School
- St. James Lutheran Church & School
- 40.4230°N 86.8878°W
- Location: Lafayette, Indiana
- Country: United States
- Denomination: Lutheran Church–Missouri Synod
- Website: www.stjameslaf.org

History
- Status: Parish church
- Founded: 1850

Architecture
- Functional status: Active

Administration
- District: Indiana District (LCMS)

Saint James Lutheran Church and School located in Lafayette, Indiana was founded in 1850 by German immigrants, is a member of the Lutheran Church–Missouri Synod and is a Confessional Lutheran congregation with approximately 800 active members. Average weekly worship attendance is approximately 550 at four services.

The school associated with the church was also founded in 1850, and is the oldest school in Tippecanoe County. The school serves children from age 2 through grade 8. Current enrollment is approximately 225. Saint James Lutheran School is accredited by the state of Indiana, and National Lutheran School Accreditation.

== Pastors ==
- Rev. Edo Lemhuis (1850–1851)
- Rev. G. Frederick Koenig (1852–1858)
- Rev. Henry Schoeneberg (1858–1889)
- Rev. George M. Schumm (1889–1916)
- Rev. Paul G. Schmidt (1916–1951)
- Rev. Kenneth R. Schueler (1951–1959)
- (Vicar David Young) (1959–1960)
- Rev. Marcus T. Lang (1960–after 1975)
- Rev. Daniel P. May (after 1975–2003) (elected president of Indiana District (LCMS) in June 2003)
- Rev. David R. French (2004–2023)
- Rev. Ed Morrow (Interim) (2023–2024)
- Rev. Dr. John J. Bombaro (2024–present)

== See also ==
- Centennial Neighborhood District
