= St. John's Episcopal Church (Lafayette, Indiana) =

Historic church in Indiana, United States

- U.S. National Register of Historic Places
- U.S. Historic district – Contributing property
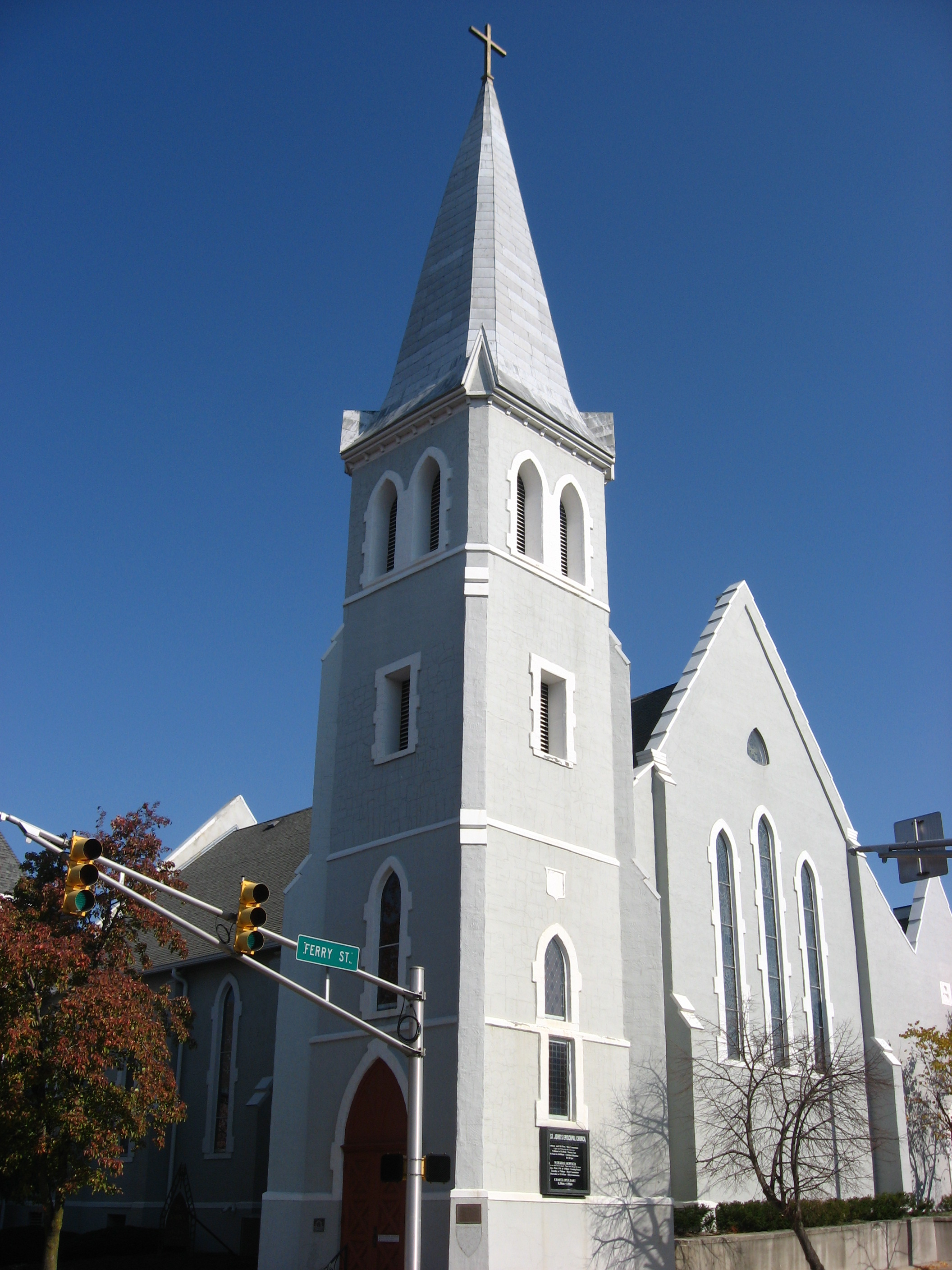
- Front and side of the church

- Location within Tippecanoe County, Indiana Location within Indiana Location within the United States
- Location: 315 N. 6th St., Lafayette, Indiana
- Coordinates: 40°25′13″N 86°53′25″W
- Area: less than one acre
- Built: 1857
- Architect: William Tinsley
- Architectural style: Gothic Revival
- NRHP reference No.: 78000055
- Added to NRHP: September 20, 1978

St. John's Episcopal Church is a historic Episcopal church located at Lafayette, Indiana. Founded by Parson Samuel R. Johnson, early services were held beginning in 1836–37 in the counting room of Thomas Benbridge. Benbridge had an accounting office. The first building dedicated on 30 Dec 1838 on Missouri St. A new Gothic Revival style church was built in 1858 on the Northwest corner of Sixth and Ferry. Major repairs were completed in 1887 with the addition of a Sunday School.

The church reported 391 members in 2022 and 153 members in 2023; no membership statistics were reported in 2024 parochial reports. Plate and pledge income reported for the congregation in 2024 was $557,626. Average Sunday attendance (ASA) in 2024 was 133 persons. St. John's is part of the Episcopal Diocese of Indianapolis.

It was listed on the National Register of Historic Places in 1978. It is located in the Centennial Neighborhood District.
