= West Lafayette Baptist Church =

Historic church in Indiana, United States

- Formerly listed on the U.S. National Register of Historic Places
- Location: 123 N. Chauncey St., West Lafayette, Indiana
- Area: 0.4 acres (0.16 ha)
- Built: 1898
- Built by: Herzog & Chow
- Architect: Alexander, J. F.
- Architectural style: Gothic
- NRHP reference No.: 79000046

Significant dates
- Added to NRHP: September 6, 1979
- Removed from NRHP: February 29, 1984

West Lafayette Baptist Church (1898–1964), also known as Church of the Good Shepherd (1964–1976), was a historic Baptist church located at West Lafayette, Indiana. It was built between 1898 and 1901, and was a two-story, cross shaped Gothic Revival style brick building. It featured a corner bell tower with three-tiered masonry buttresses. The Cynthia Jones Hall was added in 1936-1937 and the church was remodeled in 1951.

It was listed on the National Register of Historic Places in 1979, and delisted in 1984.
