= Ninth Street Hill Neighborhood Historic District =

Historic district in Indiana, United States

- U.S. National Register of Historic Places
- U.S. Historic district
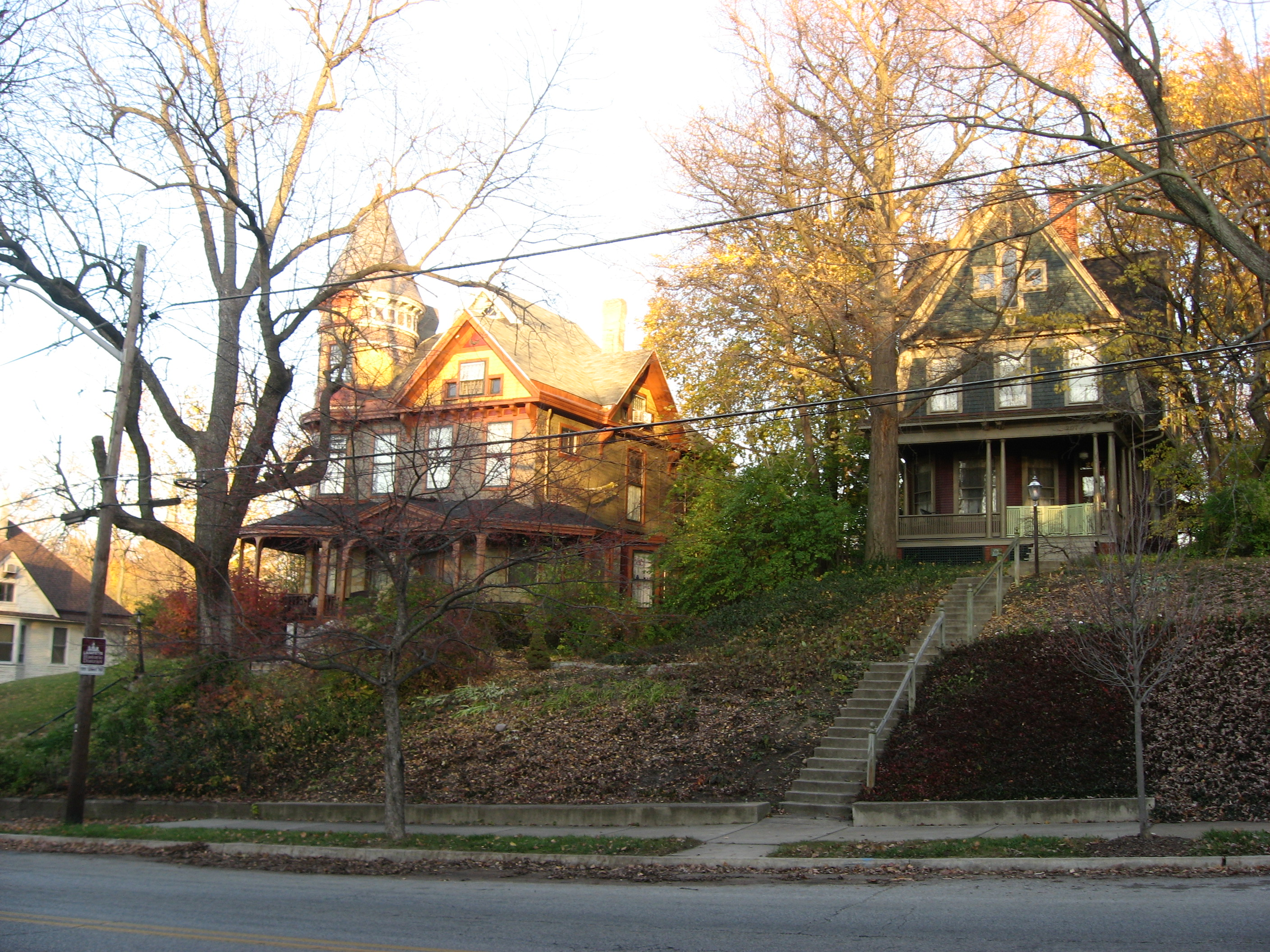
- Ninth Street Hill, November 2009

- Location within Tippecanoe County, Indiana Location within Indiana Location within the United States
- Location: Roughly, 9th St. from South to Kossuth Sts. and State St. from 9th to Kossuth Sts., Lafayette, Indiana
- Coordinates: 40°24′48″N 86°53′09″W
- Area: 30 acres (12 ha)
- Architect: Thise, Lawrence & James R.; Halstead, George
- Architectural style: Gothic Revival, Italianate, Queen Anne
- NRHP reference No.: 97000303
- Added to NRHP: April 14, 1997

Ninth Street Hill Neighborhood Historic District is a national historic district located at Lafayette, Indiana. The district encompasses 88 contributing buildings and six contributing structures in a predominantly residential section of Lafayette. It developed between about 1850 and 1946 and includes representative examples of Gothic Revival, Italianate, Queen Anne, Greek Revival, and Second Empire style architecture. Located in the district is the separately listed Judge Cyrus Ball House. Other notable contributing resources include the Samuel Moore House (1891), Moore-Porter-Boswell House (1895), Stanley Coulter House (1890), Edward Bohrer House (1909), Thomas Wood House (c. 1850), Job M. Nash House (1859), and Gordon Graham House (c. 1900).

It was listed on the National Register of Historic Places in 1997.

== See also ==
- Centennial Neighborhood District
- Downtown Lafayette Historic District
- Ellsworth Historic District
- Highland Park Neighborhood Historic District
- Jefferson Historic District
- Park Mary Historic District
- Perrin Historic District
- St. Mary Historic District
- Upper Main Street Historic District
