= Jefferson Historic District (Lafayette, Indiana) =

Historic district in Indiana, United States

- U.S. National Register of Historic Places
- U.S. Historic district
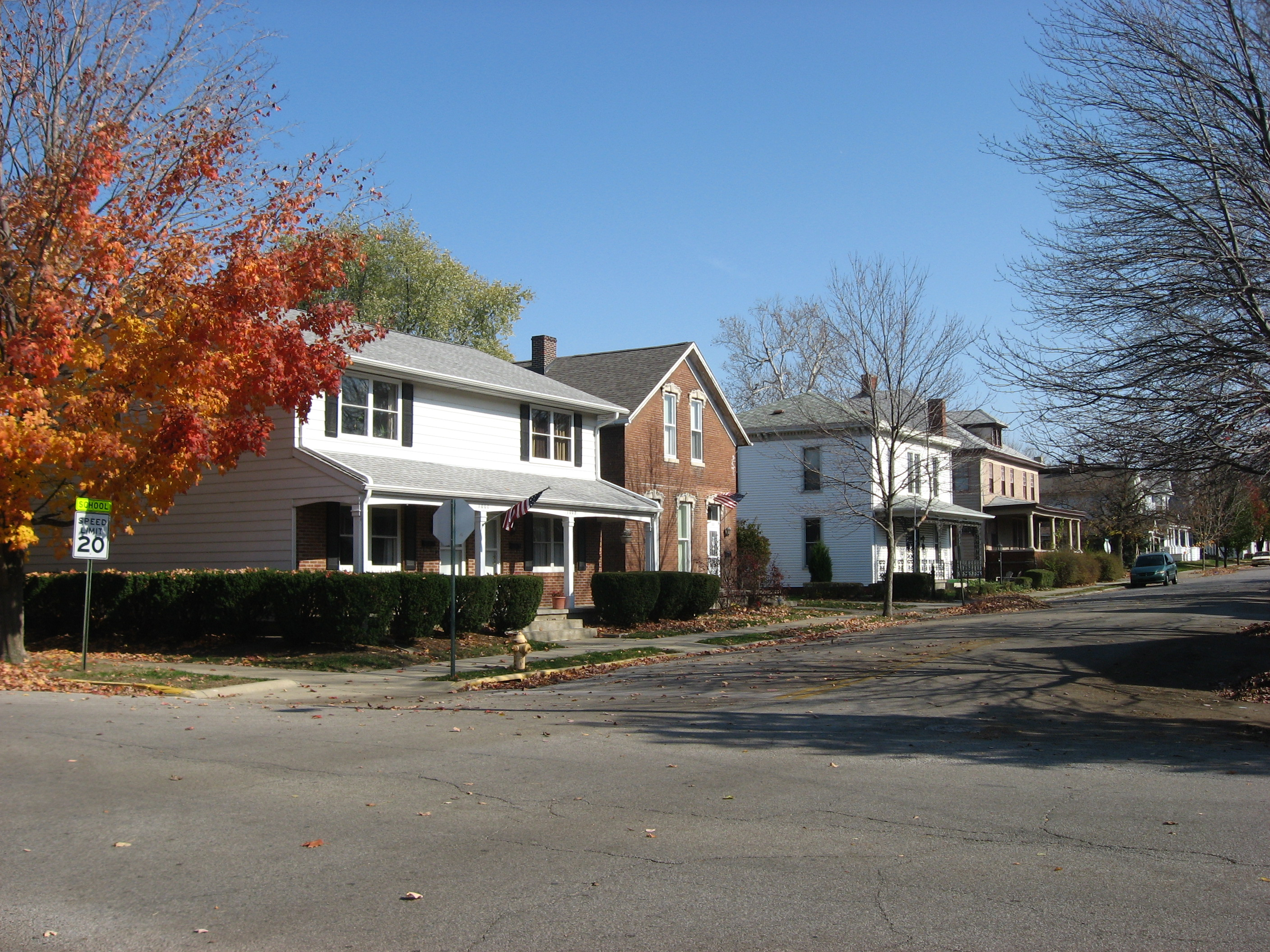
- Jefferson Historic District, November 2009

- Location within Tippecanoe County, Indiana Location within Indiana Location within the United States
- Location: Roughly bounded by 9th, Erie, Elizabeth, and Ferry Sts., Lafayette, Indiana
- Coordinates: 40°25′19″N 86°53′04″W
- Area: 22 acres (8.9 ha)
- Architect: Scholer, Walter A.
- Architectural style: Greek Revival, Italianate, et al.
- NRHP reference No.: 01000976
- Added to NRHP: September 16, 2001

Jefferson Historic District is a national historic district located at Lafayette, Indiana. The district encompasses 161 contributing buildings, two contributing sites, and 22 contributing structures in a predominantly residential section of Lafayette. It developed between about 1853 and 1951 and includes representative examples of Italianate, Greek Revival, and Bungalow / American Craftsman style architecture. Notable contributing resources include the Deutsche Evangelische Kirche (1905), Isador Metzger House (c. 1866), Hubert Gilmartin House (c. 1868), B.F. Biggs Pump Factory Building (1872, 1885–1894), Deutsche Methodist Kirche (1885), Herman & Mary Fletemeyer House (c. 1897), Mohr House (c. 1865), Warrenberg-Reule Double House (c. 1878), Alfred Gaddis House (c. 1865), Wabash Valley House (1862), Haywood Tag Company Building (1928), and Jefferson High School (1927).

It was listed on the National Register of Historic Places in 2001.

== See also ==
- Centennial Neighborhood District
- Downtown Lafayette Historic District
- Ellsworth Historic District
- Highland Park Neighborhood Historic District
- Ninth Street Hill Neighborhood Historic District
- Park Mary Historic District
- Perrin Historic District
- St. Mary Historic District
- Upper Main Street Historic District
