= Tippecanoe County Courthouse =

- U.S. National Register of Historic Places
- U.S. Historic district – Contributing property
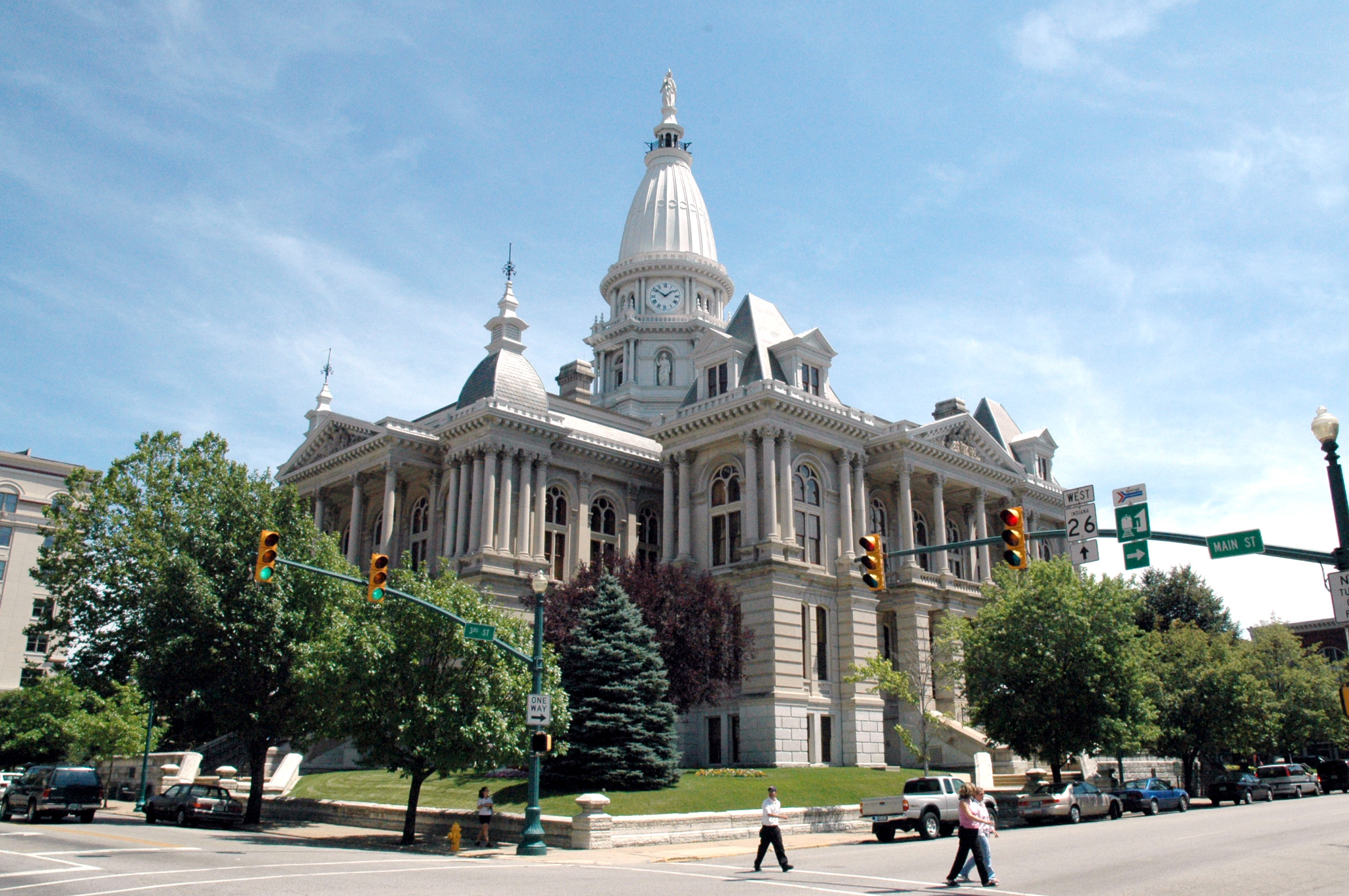
- Southern and western sides of the courthouse

- Location within Tippecanoe County, Indiana Location within Indiana Location within the United States
- Location: Public Sq., Lafayette, Indiana
- Coordinates: 40°25′7″N 86°53′37″W
- Area: less than one acre
- Built: 1881-1884
- Architect: Elias Max - Farman & Pearce; Construction overseen by Alexander, James F.
- Architectural style: Classical Revival, Beaux-Arts, and Neoclassical
- NRHP reference No.: 72000013
- Added to NRHP: October 31, 1972

The Tippecanoe County Courthouse is located on the public square in the city of Lafayette, Indiana. The public square is located between the north–south 3rd and 4th Streets and between the east–west Main and Columbia Streets.

It was listed on the National Register of Historic Places in 1972. It is located in the Downtown Lafayette Historic District.

== History ==
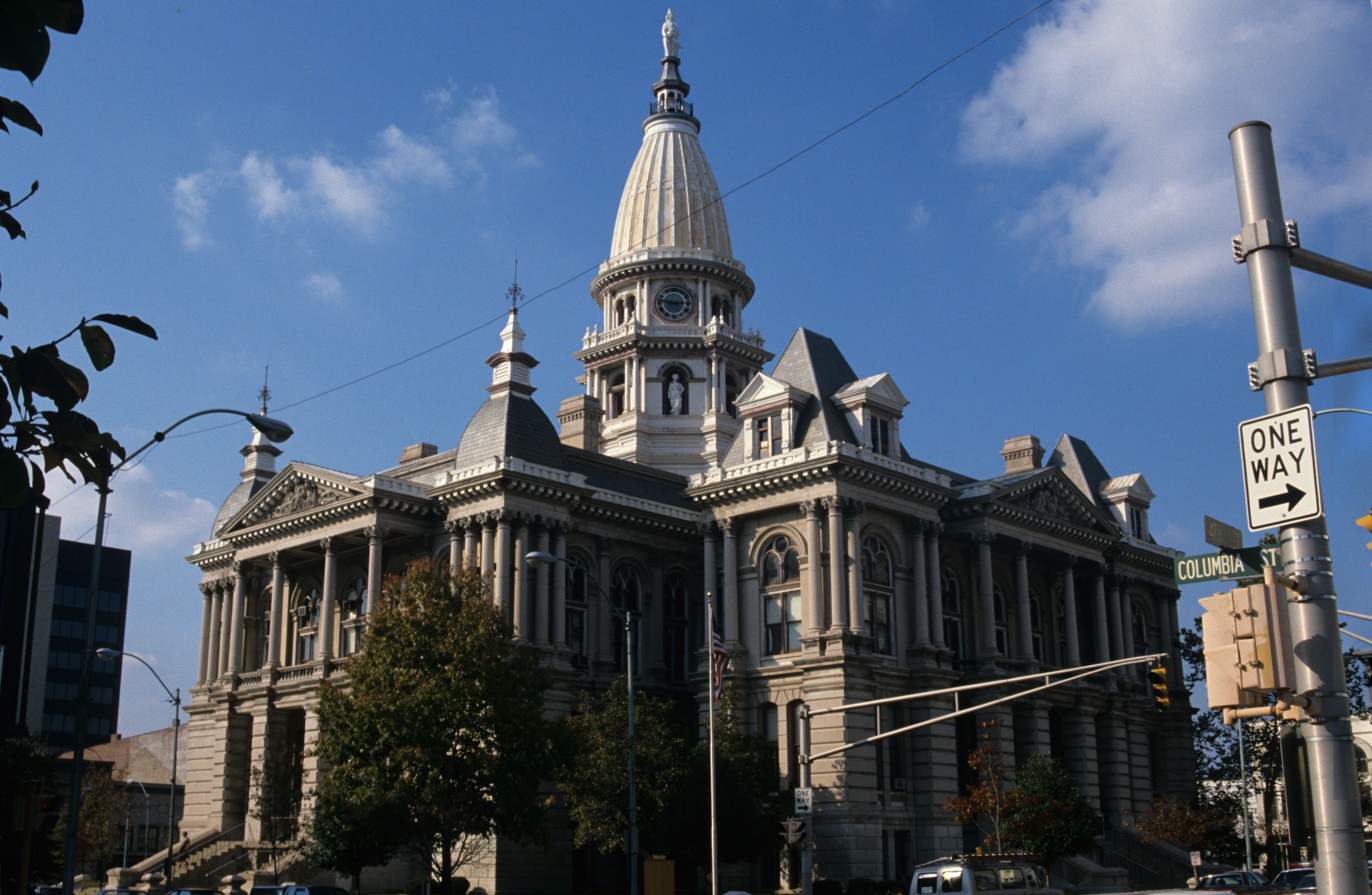

When the county was first organized in 1826, rooms were rented in which to conduct county business, until 1829 when the first courthouse was built; it was a two-story brick building. It was replaced by a larger brick building in 1845 at a cost of about $3,000; there was a fire in this building in the 1840s, but it was extinguished before it could do any damage. The third and current courthouse was built on the site from 1881 to 1884 at a cost of about $500,000. It is built of Indiana limestone and is two-and-a-half stories tall on a raised basement. Architecturally, it is a pastiche of styles including Second Empire, Beaux Arts, Baroque, Rococo, Georgian and Neo-Classical. Paul Goeldner in his study of Midwestern courthouses called the building the "epitome of county capitals".

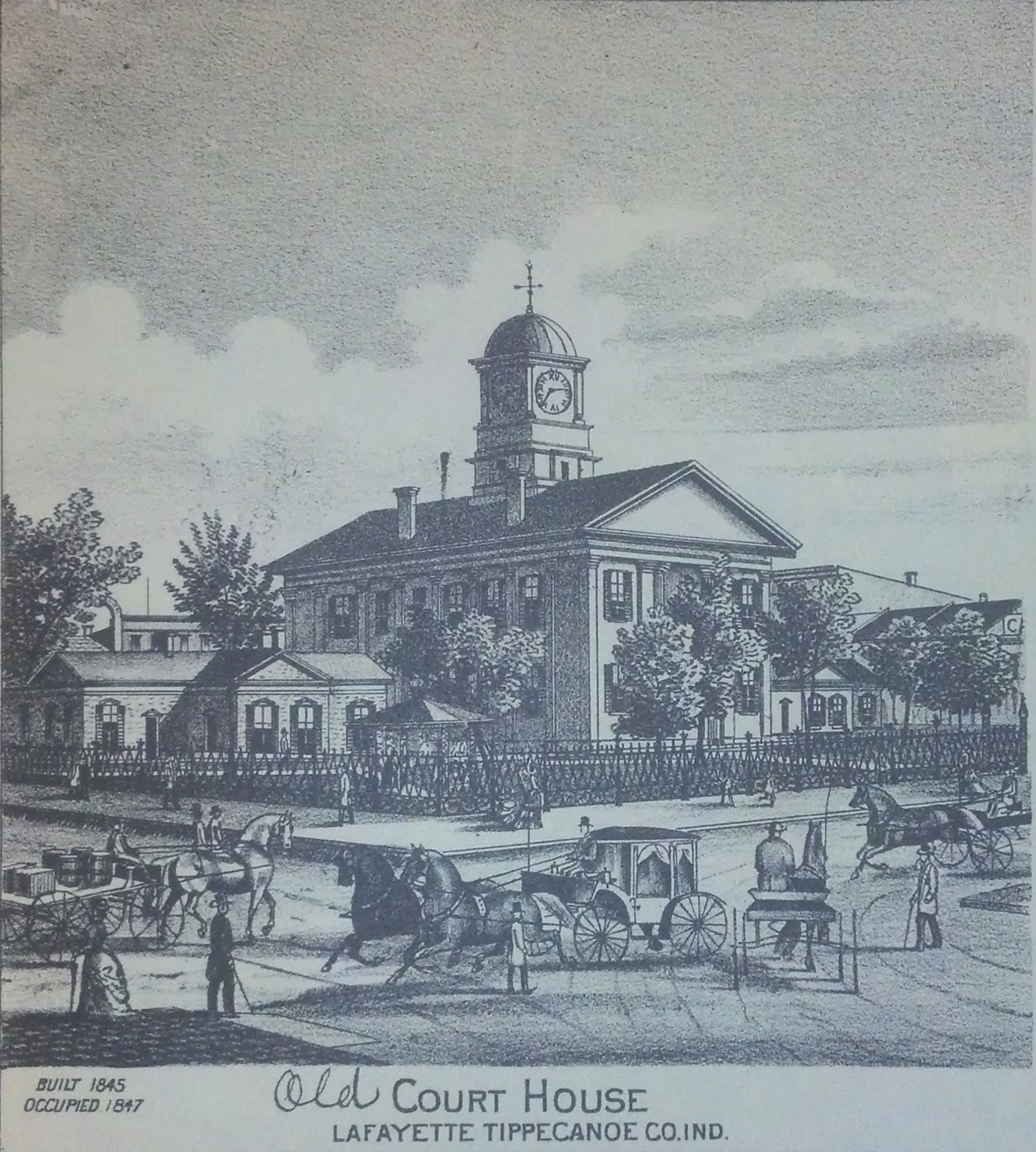
The old courthouse, built in 1845

When Samuel Clemens visited Lafayette he was asked his opinion about the Tippecanoe County Courthouse by a local newspaper reporter; Clemens replied: "Striking, striking indeed! It must have struck the taxpayers a mighty blow!" The comment was accurate as this was the most expensive courthouse built in the state until the Allen County Courthouse was built some twenty years later. The courthouse has one hundred columns, nine statues, an elongated dome with four clock faces and a 3,000-pound (1,400 kg) bell tuned to C-sharp. A 14-foot statue depicting liberty tops the courthouse dome at a height of 212 feet.

== Attempted bombing ==
On August 2, 1998, perpetrator(s) crashed a pickup truck full of gasoline and explosives through the eastern entrance of the Tippecanoe County Courthouse. Local firefighters were able to put out the blazing truck—before any of the flammable materials in the truck were able to catch fire. On August 11, county authorities placed concrete barriers around the courthouse to help prevent a similar attack in the future.

A white male in his mid-40s was wanted for questioning because he was spotted near the scene around the time the truck crashed into the courthouse. Agents with the Bureau of Alcohol, Tobacco, Firearms and Explosives found evidence at the scene and sent it for processing but no arrest was ever made for the attempted bombing of the county courthouse. In 2008, a $50,000 reward was offered for information leading to an arrest but no progress was made before the statute of limitations expired later that year. The case remains one of the few unsolved suspected instances of domestic terrorism in the United States.
