= Upper Main Street Historic District (Lafayette, Indiana) =

Historic district in Indiana, United States

- U.S. National Register of Historic Places
- U.S. Historic district
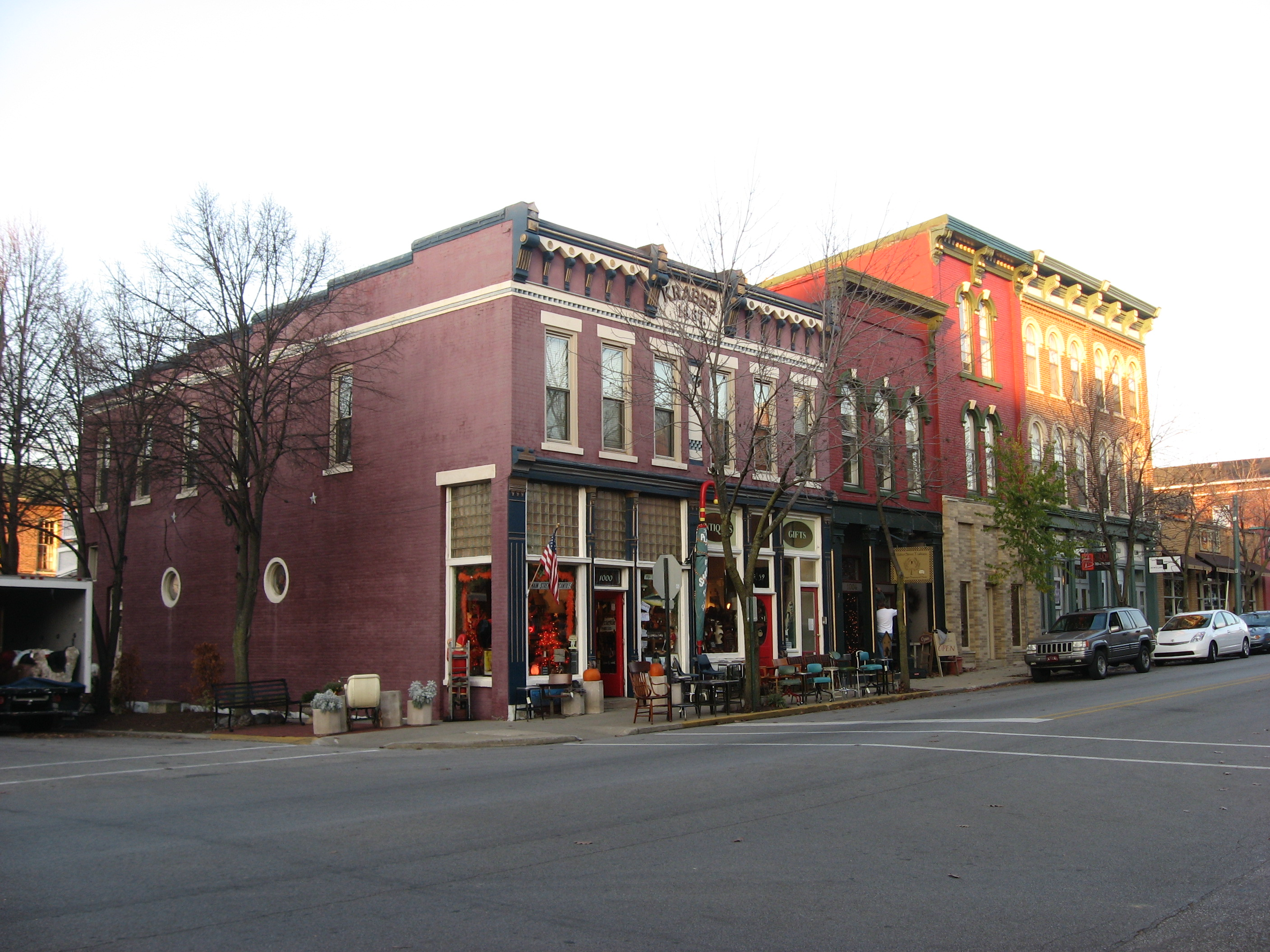
- North side of the 1000 block of Main Street

- Location within Tippecanoe County, Indiana Location within Indiana Location within the United States
- Location: Roughly bounded by Ferry St., 6th St., Columbia St., and the Norfolk and Western Railroad tracks, Lafayette, Indiana
- Coordinates: 40°25′09″N 86°53′14″W
- Area: 17 acres (6.9 ha)
- Architect: Scholer, Walter, Sr.
- Architectural style: Classical Revival, Italianate, Romanesque
- NRHP reference No.: 90000814
- Added to NRHP: May 24, 1990

Upper Main Street Historic District is a national historic district located at Lafayette, Indiana. Sixth Street was the City of Lafayette's eastern boundary when it was originally platted. By 1840, the boundary was extended to include Lake Erie and Wabash Railroad at Eleventh Street. This area became the cities commercial center. Businesses around Eleventh Street developed to meet the traveling publics needs. The Enterprise Hotel, at 1015 Main Street, as well as the Alt Heidelberg, American Lafayette and the Derby Hotel were early established by 1899.

== Significant structures ==
- 1873, Vollmer-Conrad Building, 1001 Main Street
- 1875, Enterprise Hotel, 1015 Main Street
- 1877, Beck Building, 731 Main Street
- 1877/1897, Carnahan Hall, 800 Main Street
- 1880/1919, Duplex, 612-614 Columbia Street
- 1884, Haderle Building, 1010 Main Street
- 1887, Krabbe Building, 1000-10`02 Main Street
- 1892-1893, Carnahan Building, 622 Main Street
- 1899, Weigle Townhouse, 932-925 Main Street
- 1915, D.L. Ross Building, 652-688 Main Street
- 1920-1921, Mars Theater, 111 North Sixth Street
- 1938, Lafayette Theater, 600 Main Street

All structures are historically ‘Notable’ or ‘Outstanding’ examples within the Historic District. An ‘O’ rating signifies that the structure had enough historic or architectural significance to be considered for individual listing in the National Register of Historic Places. The ‘N’ rating signifies that the structure is above average and may, with further investigation be eligible for an individual listing. The contributing structures meet the basic inventory qualifications, but fails to meet individual merit, but in combination with other closely placed similar structures warrants inclusion in an historic district.

== Gallery ==
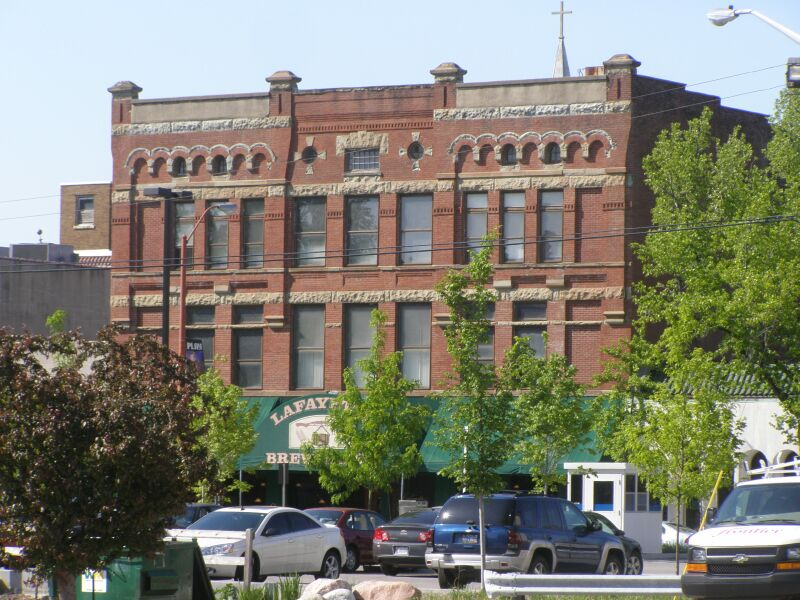
1892-1893, Carnahan Building, 622 Main Street, Lafayette, Indiana

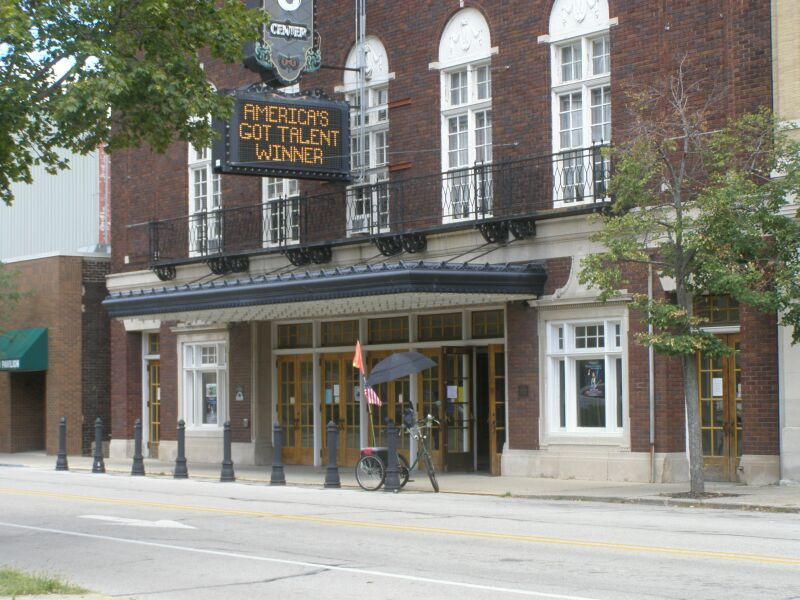
1920-1921, Mars Theater, 111 North Sixth Street, Lafayette, Indiana

== See also ==
- Centennial Neighborhood District
- Downtown Lafayette Historic District
- Ellsworth Historic District
- Highland Park Neighborhood Historic District
- Jefferson Historic District
- Ninth Street Hill Neighborhood Historic District
- Perrin Historic District
- St. Mary Historic District
