= Downtown Lafayette Historic District =

Historic district in Indiana, United States

- U.S. National Register of Historic Places
- U.S. Historic district
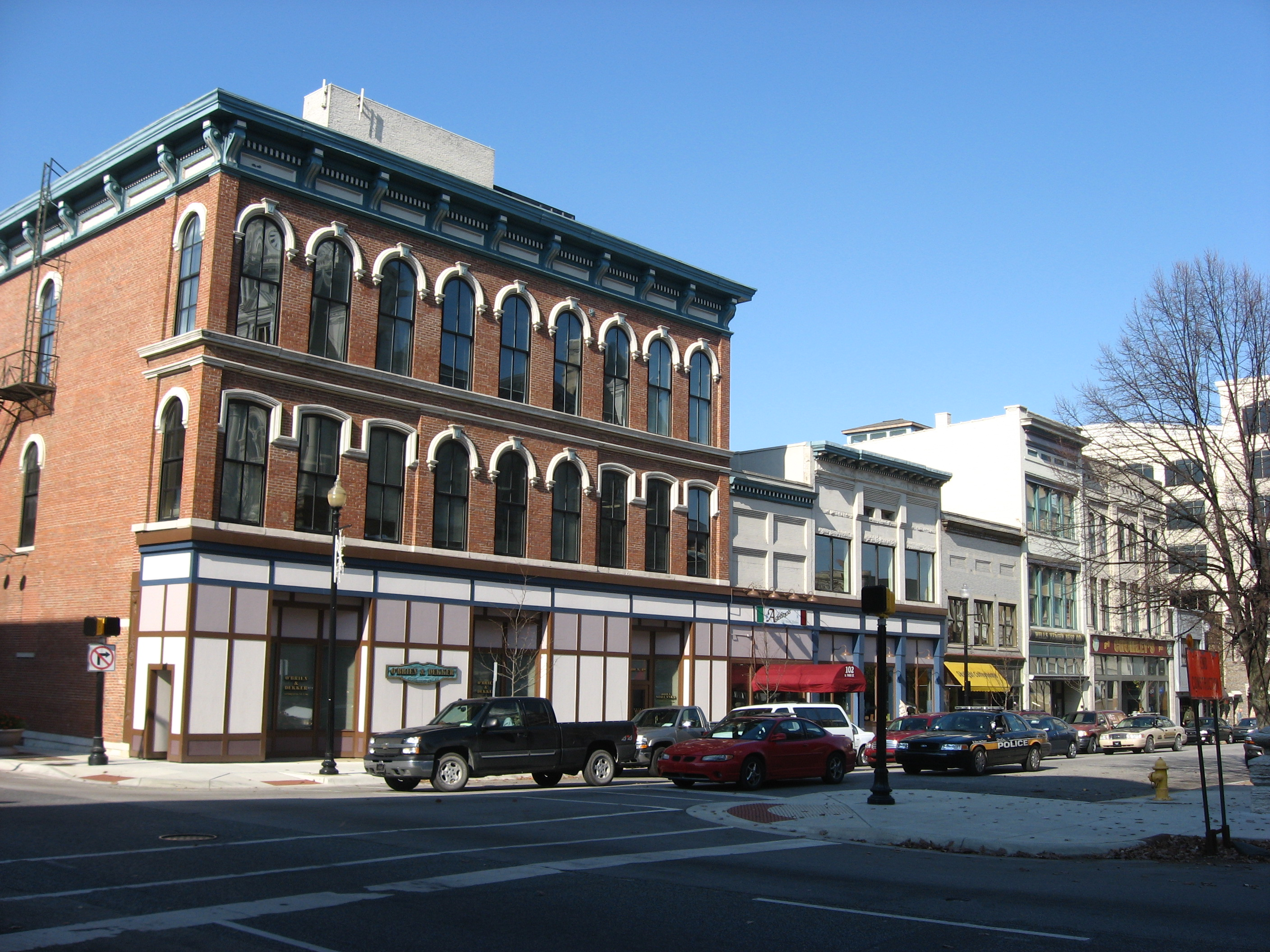
- Courthouse Square in Lafayette, November 2009

- Location within Tippecanoe County, Indiana Location within Indiana Location within the United States
- Location: Roughly bounded by 2nd, Ferry, 6th and South Sts., Lafayette, Indiana
- Coordinates: 40°25′08″N 86°53′33″W
- Area: 19.9 acres (8.1 ha)
- Built: 1825
- Architect: Multiple
- Architectural style: Second Empire, Italianate, Art Deco
- NRHP reference No.: 80000067
- Added to NRHP: November 28, 1980

Downtown Lafayette Historic District is a national historic district located at Lafayette, Indiana. Lafayette began in 1825 as a transportation center for the west central area of Indiana. Its development and growth reflects the changes in transportation over the intervening years. From its location along the Wabash River, it grew first with river travel then for a short while from the Wabash and Erie Canal. When the railroads arrived in the 1850s, the town began to grow, initially along the rail lines. The Downtown Lafayette Historic District reflects these early changes.

== History ==
Lafayette was settled here, because of the nearness of the Wabash River. William Digby platted the town in 1825. The boundaries were the river on the west, Sixth Street on the east, with North Street and South Street creating the north and south edges. Development followed along with the advances in transportation.

The first period of expansion began with the construction of a log courthouse in 1829. The second period of expansion began in 1843 with the arrival of the Wabash and Erie Canal, connecting the county with Toledo and markets on the east coast. The courthouse was replaced with a brick building and Fifth Street was widened to create an open market.

Within a decade, the railroads arrived in town and the third period of expansion began. The Lafayette & Indianapolis Railroad was the first railroad to arrive in Lafayette in 1852. In 1853, the New Albany and Salem Railroad, later called the Monon Railroad that arrived, following Fifth Street. The following year, 1854, the Wabash Line cut across the southeast corner of the city, crossing Main Street at Eleventh.

The railroads spurred the growth of the town by expanding its markets. Commercial structures such as the Hatcher Building, 1865; the Milwaukee Block, 1866; the Perrin Building, 1877; and many other buildings along Main Street reflect this period of growth.

== Significant structures ==
- 1860, River City Market, 102-112 North Third Street
- 1865, Hatcher Building, 10 North Third Street
- 1866, Milwaukee Block, 502-518 Main Street
- 1870/1914, Oppenheimer Building, 400 Main Street
- 1877, Perrin Building, 332 Main Street
- 1881-1884, Tippecanoe County Courthouse, Courthouse Square
- 1890, Hirsh Brothers Building, 427 Main Street
- 1892/1913, Murdock Building, 226 North Sixth Street
- 1907 Heiremans Building, 219 Main Street
- 1910, O'Farrell Building, 408-414 Main Street
- 1910, Sharp Block, 516 Main Street
- 1912, Robertson Building, 336-340 Main Street
- 1915, Fowler Hotel, 407 Ferry Street
- 1917/1918, First Merchants National Bank, 216 Main Street
- 1918, Lafayette Life Building, 200-206 Main Street
- 1926, Lafayette National Bank, 337 Columbia Street
- 1931, U.S. Post Office Building, 301 Ferry Street
- Adjacent to, but not within the district
  - 1902, Big Four Depot,

== See also ==
- Centennial Neighborhood District
- Ellsworth Historic District
- Highland Park Neighborhood Historic District
- Jefferson Historic District
- Ninth Street Hill Neighborhood Historic District
- Park Mary Historic District
- Perrin Historic District
- St. Mary Historic District
- Upper Main Street Historic District

== Sources ==
- Interim Report Tippecanoe County Interim Report, Indiana Historic Sites and Structures Inventory; Historic Landmarks Foundation of Indiana; May 1990
