= Judge Cyrus Ball House =

Historic house in Indiana, United States

- U.S. National Register of Historic Places
- U.S. Historic district – Contributing property
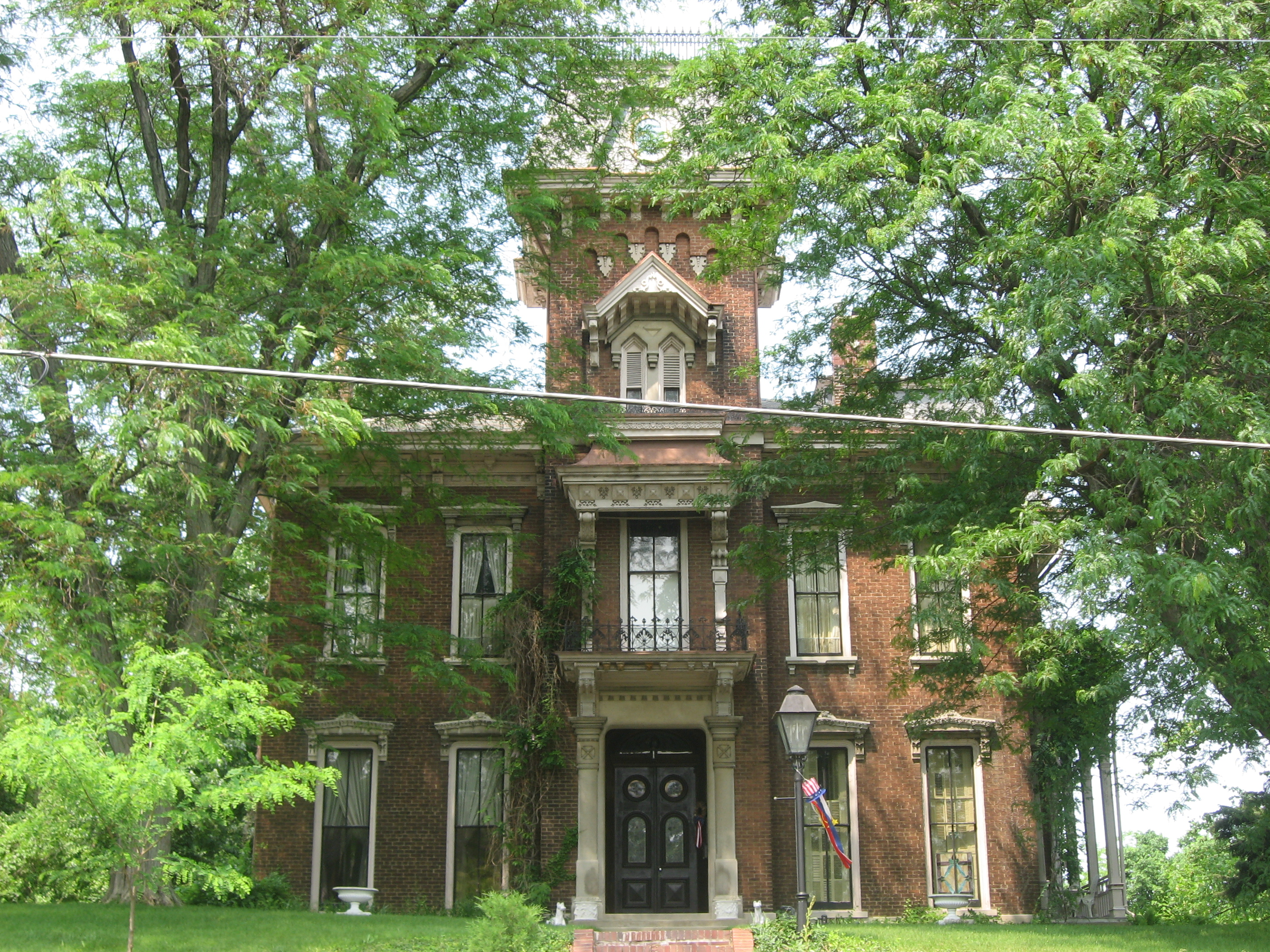
- Judge Cyrus Ball House, June 2011

- Location within Tippecanoe County, Indiana Location within Indiana Location within the United States
- Location: 402 S. 9th St., Lafayette, Indiana
- Coordinates: 40°24′49″N 86°53′12″W
- Area: 1.9 acres (0.77 ha)
- Built: 1868-1869
- Architect: Post, George
- Architectural style: Second Empire
- NRHP reference No.: 84001649
- Added to NRHP: May 3, 1984

Judge Cyrus Ball House, also known as the Ball Mansion and Carriage House, is a historic home located at Lafayette, Indiana. It was built in 1868–1869, and is a two-story, Second Empire style brick dwelling, with a three-story mansard roofed entrance tower. It sits on a limestone foundation, has intricate wood and stone detailing, and a slate roof. Also on the property is a contributing two-story, rectangular carriage house.

It was listed on the National Register of Historic Places in 1984. It is located in the Ninth Street Hill Neighborhood Historic District.

== Cyrus Ball ==
Lebanon, Ohio native Cyrus Ball (1804–1893) was the youngest of a family of six children — four boys and two girls. He worked on his family farm and, while still quite young, began teaching at a country school.

In 1825, Ball left the farm to begin studying law. He was admitted to the Ohio bar the following year, when he also moved west with his cousin, Justice Harlan. In the spring of 1827, he moved to Lafayette, Indiana, with merchandise stock purchased in Baltimore, Maryland, and he and one of his brothers started a general store. Eighteen months later, he had become the sole owner of the business.

In 1828, Ball was admitted to the bar in Indiana, and the following year he was elected Justice of the Peace, as which he served for five years.

He formed a dry goods business with James Hill and Peter S. Jennings. Hill died in 1837, at which point the firm became Ball & Jennings. Ball eventually sold the business to Jennings, and with the capital bought the property at the northwest corner of Third and Main Streets in Lafayette for $150.

Ball married Cornelia Smith, who died within three years of their wedlock. They had two children together (Cornelia and Margaret), but both died in infancy. He remarried in 1838, to Rebecca Gordon (1816–1900), of Philadelphia, with whom he had five children.

The Wabash and Erie Canal made Ball collector of tolls in 1840, and the following year he was appointed cashier at the Lafayette branch of the Bank of Indiana.

Ball was elected one of the three associate Judges for the district in 1840.

He became the president of Lafayette Artificial Gas Company upon its formation, holding a large amount of stock in the company.

With Albert S. White, Ball became a key factor in the construction of the railroad to Indianapolis, which became part of the Big Four system.

Upon retiring, Ball built a residence on South Ninth Street (where William Lloyd Garrison was once a guest), where he lived until his death in 1893, aged 89. He is buried in Lafayette's Greenbush Cemetery, where both of his spouses are interred, as are all but one of his known children (Cyrus Gordon Ball is buried in Spring Vale Cemetery, two miles to the northeast).
