= Highland Park Neighborhood Historic District =

Historic district in Indiana, United States

- U.S. National Register of Historic Places
- U.S. Historic district
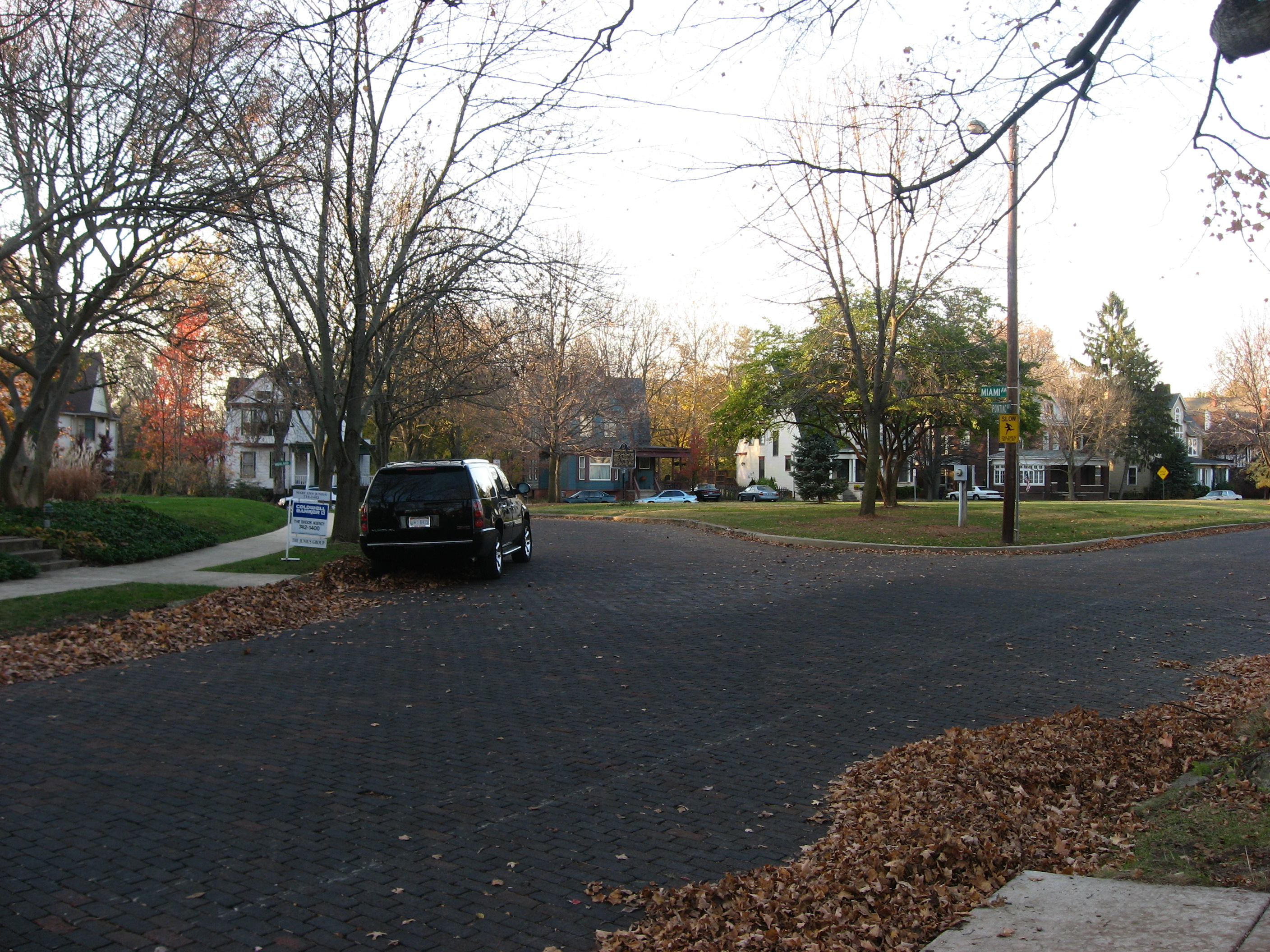
- Brick intersection in Highland Park, November 2009

- Location within Tippecanoe County, Indiana Location within Indiana Location within the United States
- Location: Roughly bounded by Kossuth St., S. 9th St., Cherokee Ave. and 4th St., Lafayette, Indiana
- Coordinates: 40°24′22″N 86°53′21″W
- Area: 54 acres (22 ha)
- Architect: Earnshaw & Punshon; Nicol, Charles W.
- Architectural style: Queen Anne, Bungalow/craftsman, Tudor Revival
- NRHP reference No.: 96000270
- Added to NRHP: March 14, 1996

Highland Park Neighborhood Historic District is a national historic district located at Lafayette, Indiana. The district encompasses 240 contributing buildings, one contributing site, and one contributing structure in a planned residential subdivision of Lafayette. It developed between about 1892 and 1945 and includes representative examples of Queen Anne, Tudor Revival, and Bungalow / American Craftsman style architecture. Notable contributing resources include the Blistain Axel Merritt House (1914), John Wagner Jr. House (c. 1893), John Ross House (c. 1895), and Bicycle Bridge (1924).

It was listed on the National Register of Historic Places in 1996.

== See also ==
- Centennial Neighborhood District
- Downtown Lafayette Historic District
- Ellsworth Historic District
- Jefferson Historic District
- Ninth Street Hill Neighborhood Historic District
- Park Mary Historic District
- Perrin Historic District
- St. Mary Historic District
- Upper Main Street Historic District
