= Enterprise Hotel =

- U.S. National Register of Historic Places
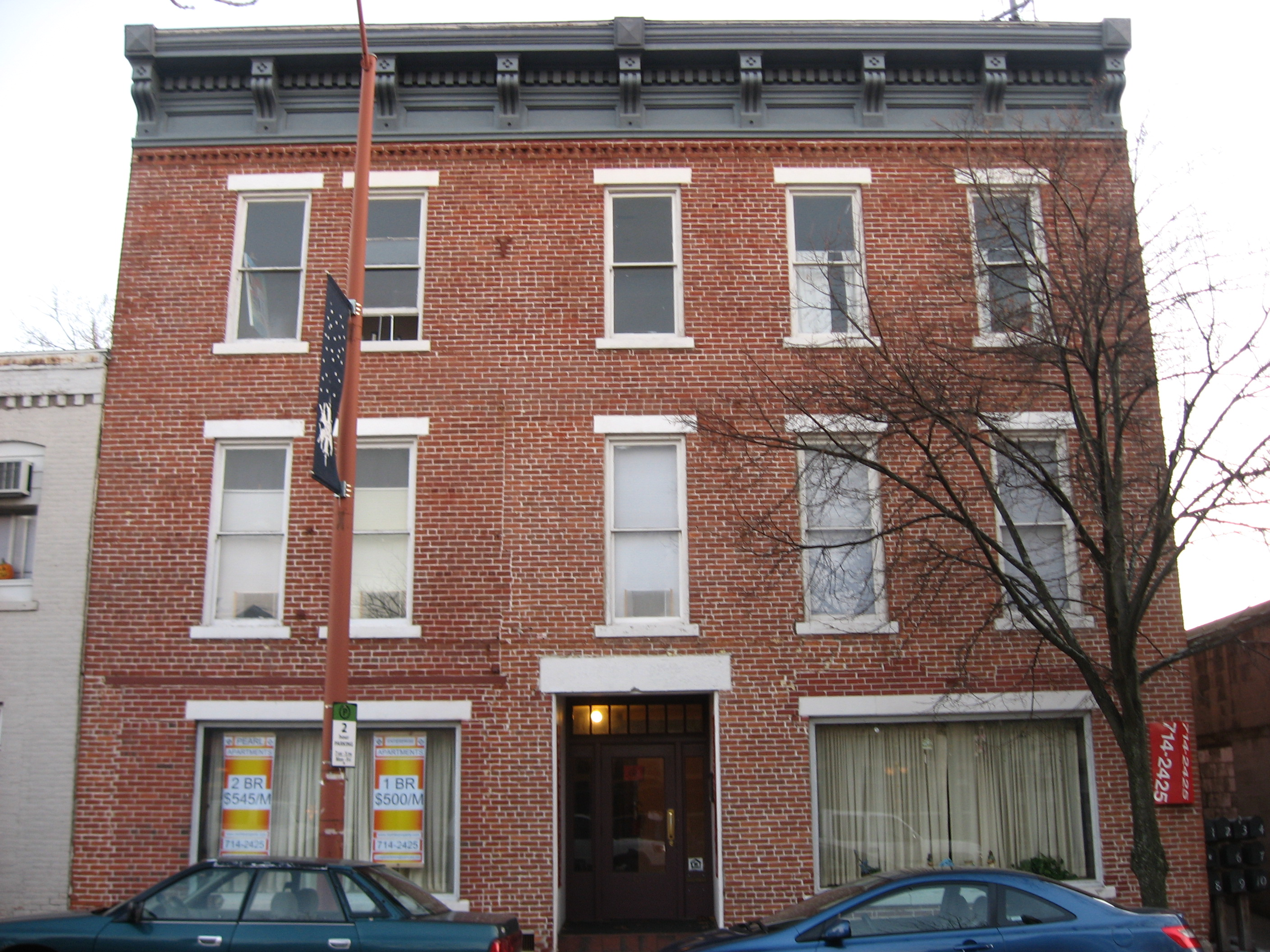
- Enterprise Hotel, November 2009

- Location within Tippecanoe County, Indiana Location within Indiana Location within the United States
- Location: 1015 Main St., Lafayette, Indiana
- Coordinates: 40°25′8″N 86°53′6″W
- Area: less than one acre
- Built: 1895
- Architectural style: Italianate
- NRHP reference No.: 84001650
- Added to NRHP: June 21, 1984

Enterprise Hotel, also known as Gasthaus Alt Heidelberg, is a historic hotel building located at Lafayette, Indiana. It was built in 1895, and is a three-story, five-bay, rectangular, Italianate style brick building, with rear additions. It measures 42 feet wide and 32 feet deep. It is historically significant as a European style tavern / inn.

It was listed on the National Register of Historic Places in 1984.
