= Falley Home =

Historic house in Indiana, United States

- U.S. National Register of Historic Places
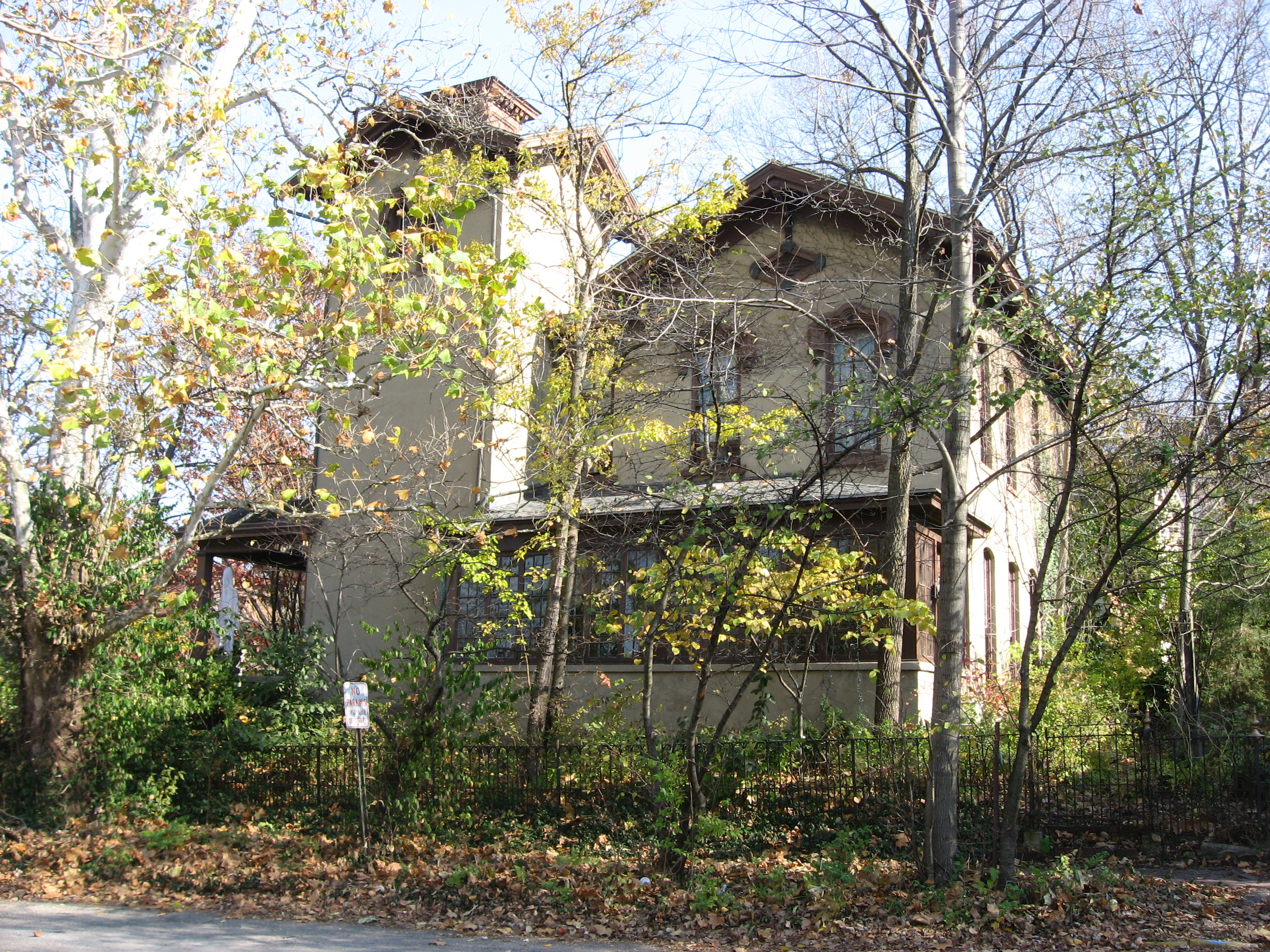
- Falley Home, November 2009

- Location within Tippecanoe County, Indiana Location within Indiana Location within the United States
- Location: 601 New York St., Lafayette, Indiana
- Coordinates: 40°24′52″N 86°53′24″W
- Area: 0.2 acres (0.081 ha)
- Built: 1863
- Architectural style: Italian Villa
- NRHP reference No.: 82000078
- Added to NRHP: July 15, 1982

Falley Home, also known as the Lahr Home, is a historic home located at Lafayette, Indiana. The Italian Villa style brick house was built in 1863, and consists of three two-story sections and a three-story entrance tower. It is sheathed in stucco. The square corner entrance tower is topped by a cupola and encloses a curve staircase.

It was listed on the National Register of Historic Places in 1982.
