= St. Mary Historic District (Lafayette, Indiana) =

Historic district in Indiana, United States

- U.S. National Register of Historic Places
- U.S. Historic district
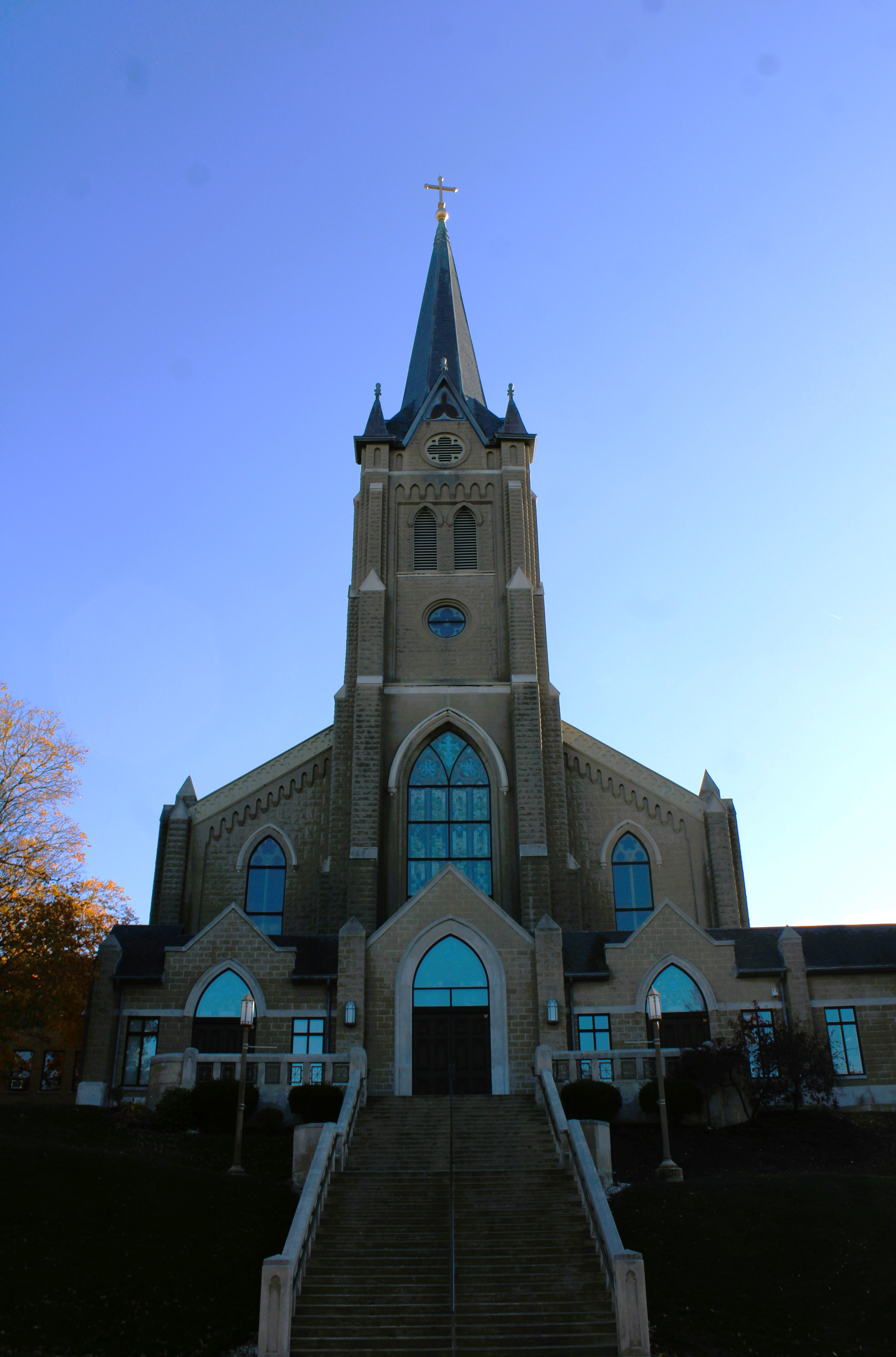
- Saint Mary Cathedral of the Immaculate Conception in 2023

- Location within Tippecanoe County, Indiana Location within Indiana Location within the United States
- Location: Roughly bounded by Main, South, 10th and 14th Sts., Lafayette, Indiana
- Coordinates: 40°25′01″N 86°52′51″W
- Area: 358 acres (145 ha)
- Built: 1950-1974, 1925-1949, 1900-1924, 1875-1899, 1850-1874, 1825-1849
- Architect: Multiple
- Architectural style: Italianate, Greek Revival
- NRHP reference No.: 01000622
- Added to NRHP: 2001

St. Mary Historic District is a national historic district located at Lafayette, Indiana. In 1864, St. Mary's Catholic Church relocated from its original site at Fifth and Brown Streets to Columbia Street. With the move, many of the congregation also moved to this area. The Church became both a religious and social center for the neighborhood. Many of the homes date from the 1860s and 1870s and include fine examples of the Italianate, Greek Revival and Queen Anne styles as well as vernacular house types. Most of the people who built in this area were Lafayette businessmen. At 1202 Columbia Street James Ball, a local wholesale grocer left his name stamped into the front steps. Across the street is the James H. Ward House, who along with his brother, William, owned a local carpet and wallpaper business.

James Murdock House moved onto Columbia Street in approximately 1891 after he left Michigan City, where he had been the warden of the state prison He was the operator of a grocery and produce business and in bridge and road construction. The home was sold to Ferdinand Dryfus who, with his brother Leopold, ran the Dryfus Packing and Provision Company.

All structures are historically ‘Notable’ or ‘Outstanding’ examples within the Historic District. An ‘O’ rating signifies that the structure had enough historic or architectural significance to be considered for individual listing in the National Register of Historic Places. The ‘N’ rating signifies that the structure is above average and may, with further investigation be eligible for an individual listing. The contributing structures meet the basic inventory qualifications, but fails to meet individual merit, but in combination with other closely placed similar structures warrants inclusion in an historic district.

== Significant structures ==
Columbia Street

- 1104 - Dr. George Beasley House, Colonial Revival, 1902 (O)
- 1116 - James H. Ward House, Italianate, 1860 (O) NR
- 1207 - Cathedral of Saint Mary of the Immaculate Conception, Gothic Revival, 1864, (O)
- 1211 – Joseph Shearn House; Italianate, c. 1870 (N)
- 1214 - James Ball House, Gable-front/Greek Revival/Italianate, 1862 (O)
- 1307 - James Murdock House, Queen Anne, c. 1890 (N)
- 1304 - Robert Davidson House, American four-square, c. 1910 (N)
- 1311 – Laura and Philomene Wagner House; Colonial Revival, c. 1895 (N)
- 1318 - Francis Duffy House; Italianate,1868 (O)
- 1321 – House; Queen Anne, c. 1890 (N)
- 1402 – House; Italianate, c 1880 (N)
- 1413 – House, Italianate, c.1870 (N)
- 1417 – House, Italianate, c.1870 (N)

Main Street

- 1501 – House; Gable-front, c. 1880 (N)
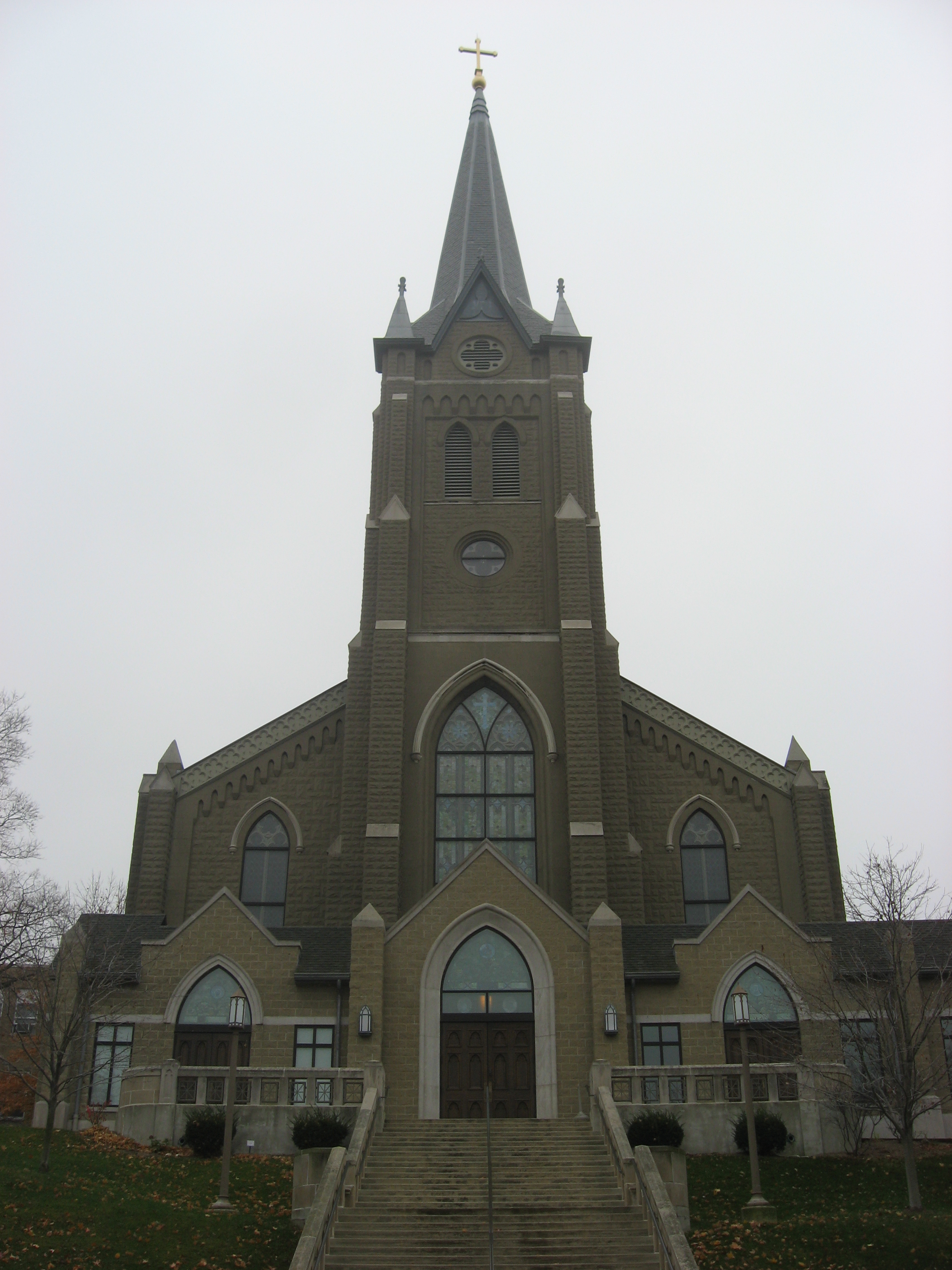
Cathedral of Saint Mary of the Immaculate Conception, Gothic Revival, 1864, (O)

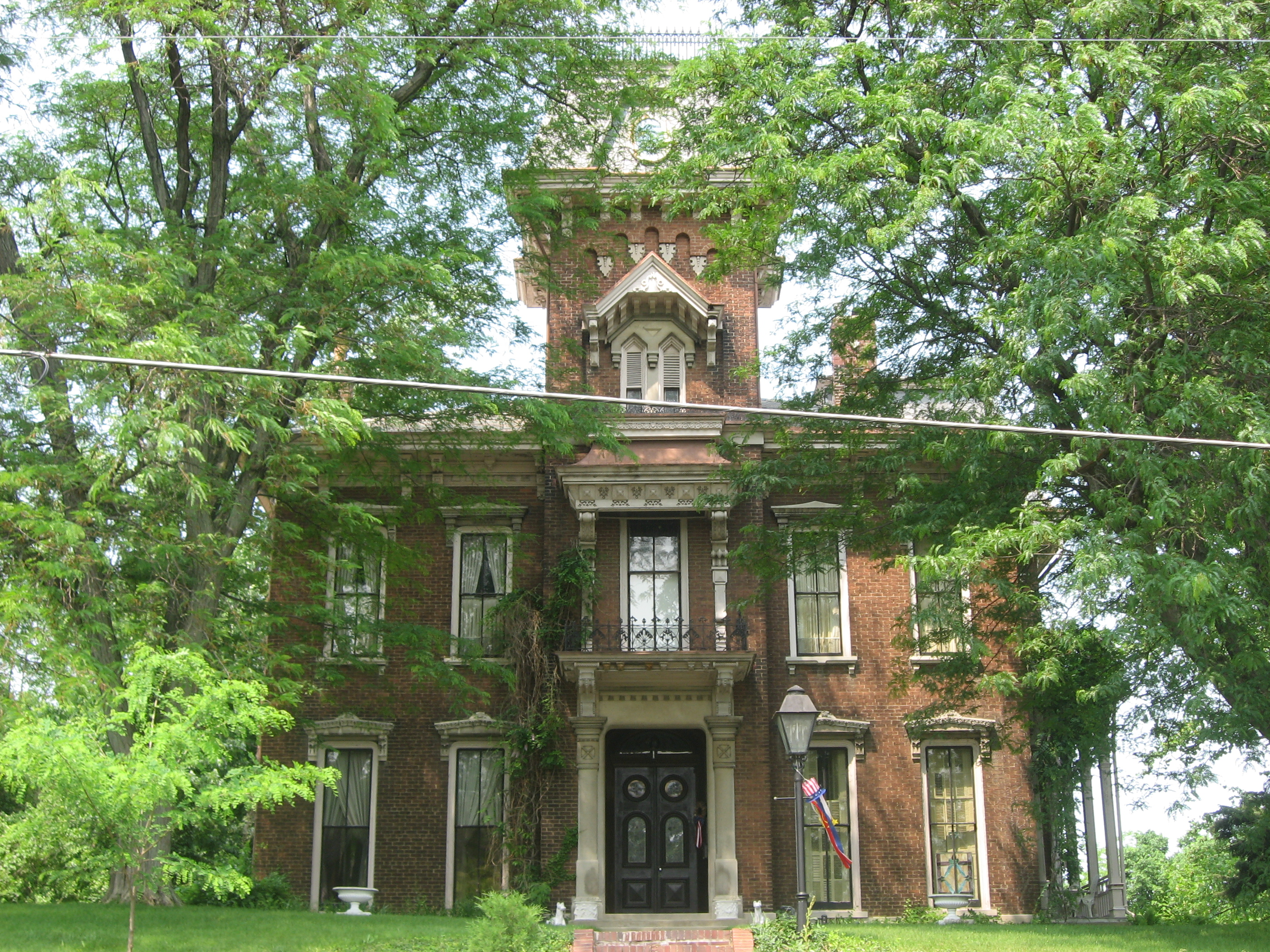
Judge Cyrus Ball House, Second Empire, 1869 (O)

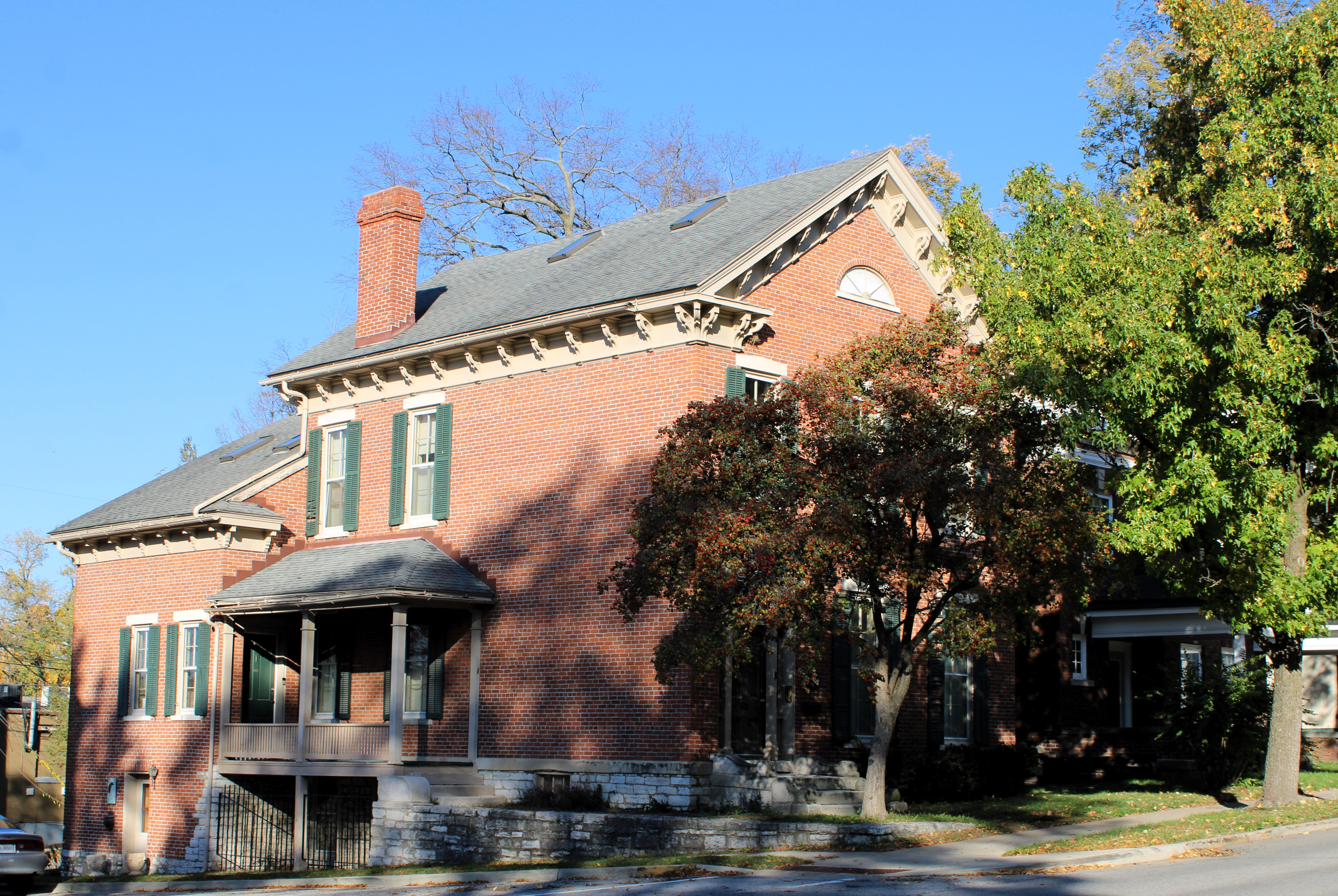
James Ball House, Gable-front/Greek Revival/Italianate, 1862 (O)

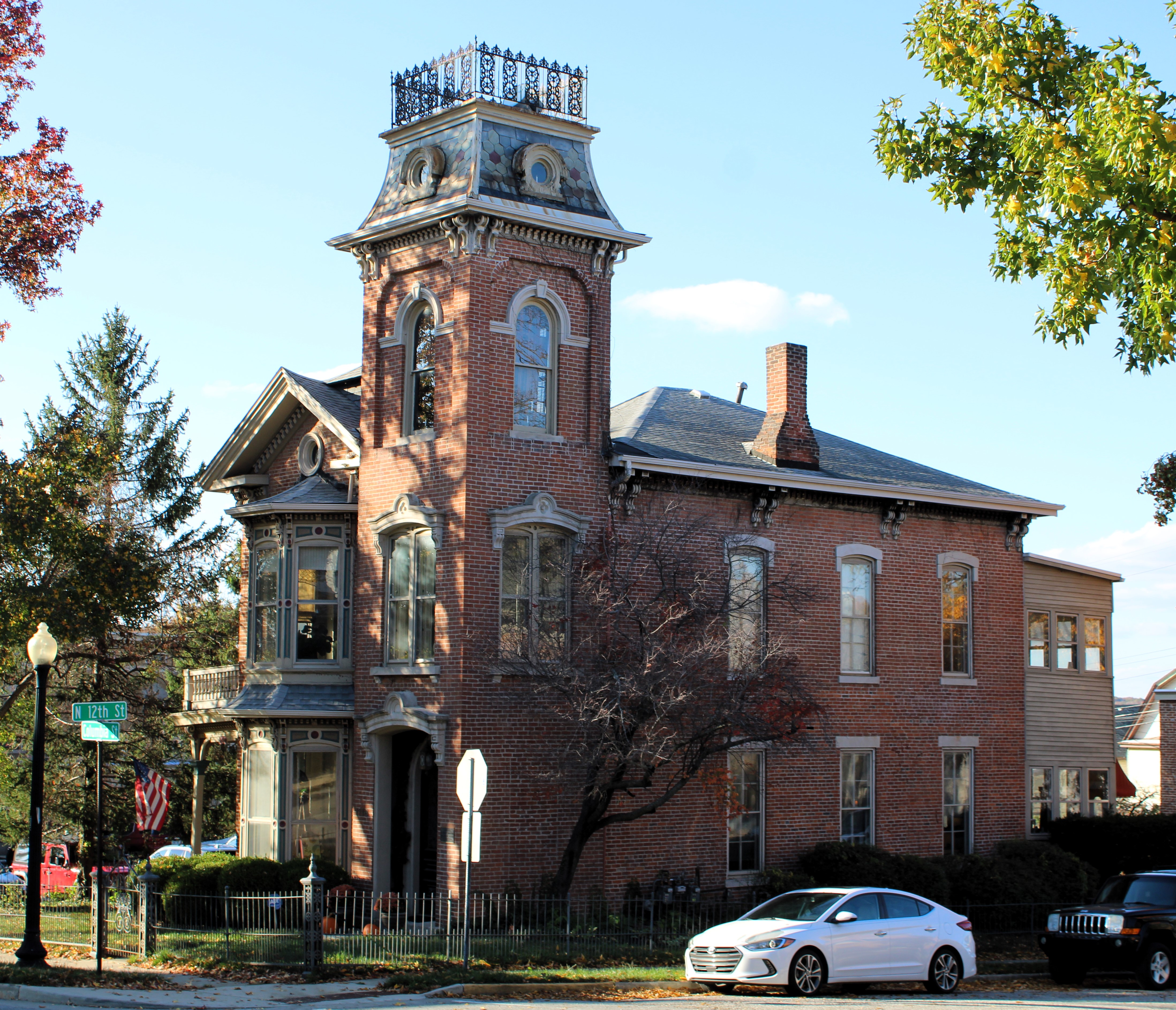
James H. Ward House, Italianate, c. 1875 (O)

== See also ==
- Centennial Neighborhood District
- Downtown Lafayette Historic District
- Ellsworth Historic District
- Highland Park Neighborhood Historic District
- Jefferson Historic District
- Ninth Street Hill Neighborhood Historic District
- Perrin Historic District
- Upper Main Street Historic District

== Sources ==
Interim Report Tippecanoe County Interim Report, Indiana Historic Sites and Structures Inventory; Historic Landmarks Foundation of Indiana; July 1991
