= Perrin Historic District =

Historic district in Indiana, United States

- U.S. National Register of Historic Places
- U.S. Historic district
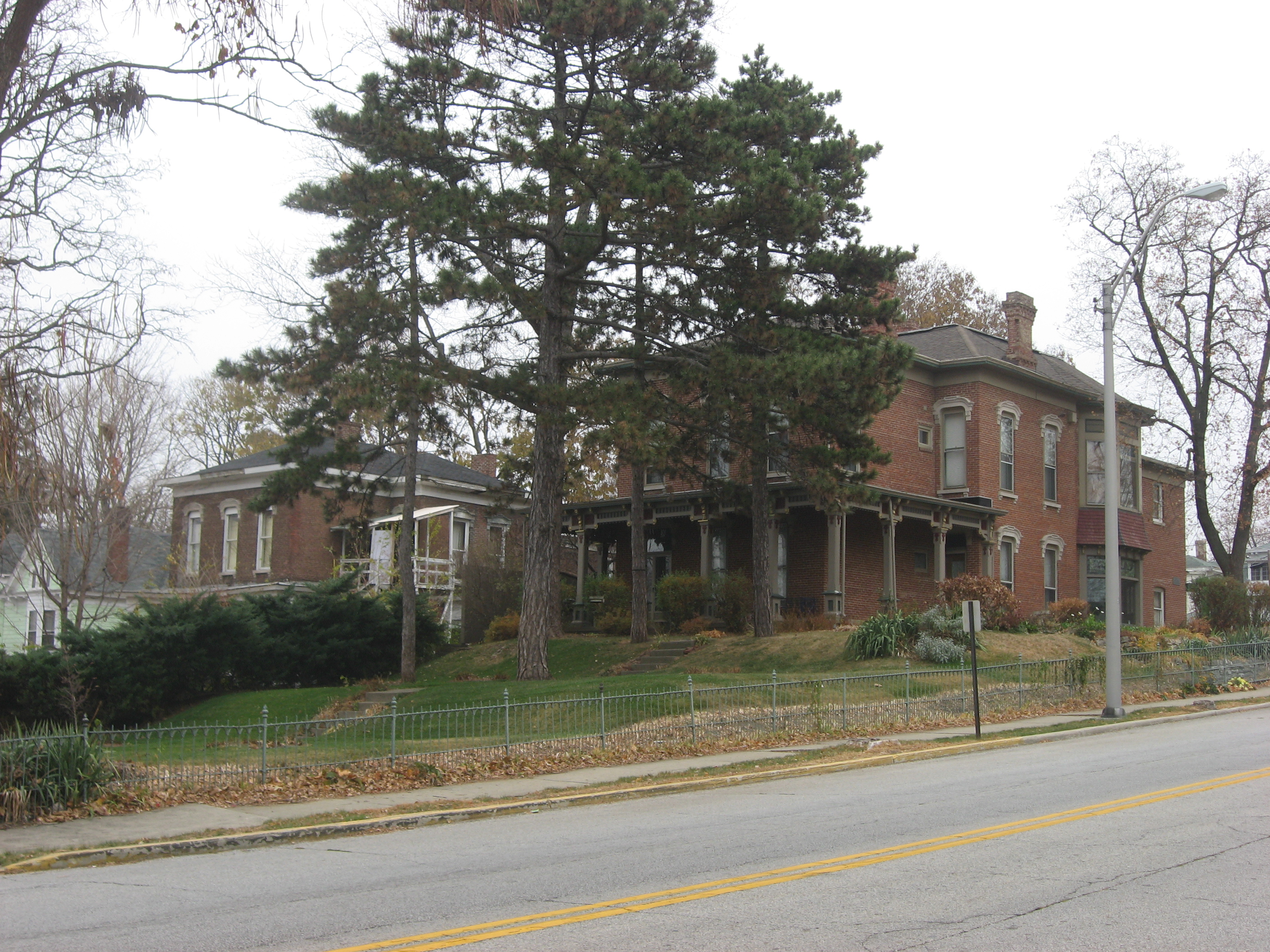
- Perrin Historic District Houses, November 2010

- Location within Tippecanoe County, Indiana Location within Indiana Location within the United States
- Location: Roughly bounded by Murdock Park, Sheridan Rd., Columbia, Main and Union Sts., Lafayette, Indiana
- Coordinates: 40°25′14″N 86°52′47″W
- Area: 60 acres (24 ha)
- Built: 1873
- Architect: Multiple
- Architectural style: Late Victorian, Mixed (more Than 2 Styles From Different Periods)
- NRHP reference No.: 79000045
- Added to NRHP: September 10, 1979

Perrin Historic District is a national historic district located at Lafayette, Indiana. The district encompasses 173 contributing buildings and two contributing structures in a predominantly residential section of Lafayette. It developed between about 1869 and 1923 and includes representative examples of Italianate, Queen Anne, Colonial Revival, Stick Style / Eastlake movement, and Bungalow / American Craftsman style architecture. Notable contributing buildings include the James Perrin House (1869, c. 1890), John Heinmiller House (c. 1885), James H. Cable House (c. 1898), Adam Herzog House (1878), Coleman-Gude House (1875), Frank Bernhardt House (1873), August Fisher Cottage (c. 1910), John Beck House (1887), an William H. Sarles Bungalow (1923).

It was listed on the National Register of Historic Places in 1979.

== See also ==
- Centennial Neighborhood District
- Downtown Lafayette Historic District
- Ellsworth Historic District
- Highland Park Neighborhood Historic District
- Jefferson Historic District
- Ninth Street Hill Neighborhood Historic District
- Park Mary Historic District
- St. Mary Historic District
- Upper Main Street Historic District
