= Centennial Neighborhood District =

Historic district in Indiana, United States

- U.S. National Register of Historic Places
- U.S. Historic district
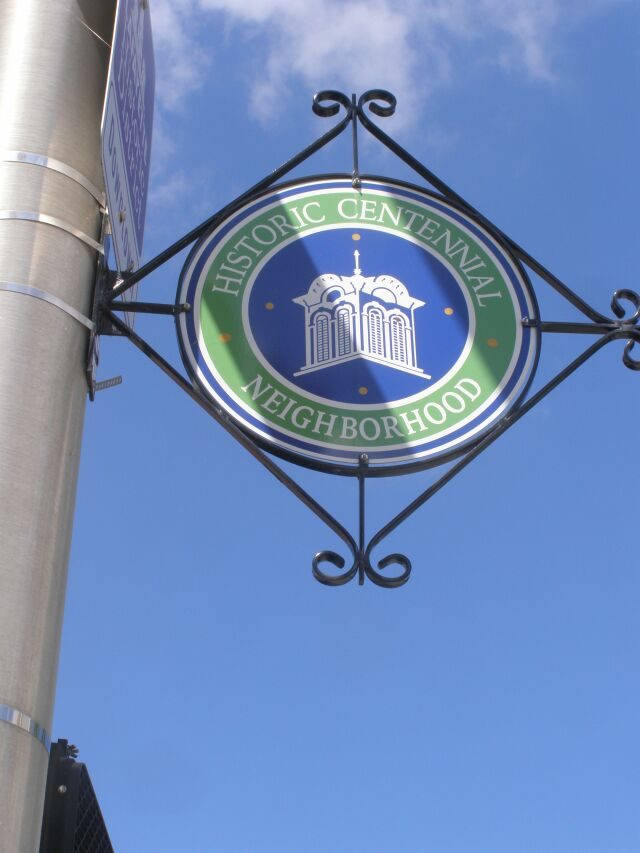
- Street markers are located on major roads, entering the centennial historic district.

- Location within Tippecanoe County, Indiana Location within Indiana Location within the United States
- Location: Roughly bounded by Union, 3rd, 4th, Ferry, and 9th Sts., Lafayette, Indiana
- Coordinates: 40°25′21″N 86°53′25″W
- Area: 63 acres (25 ha)
- Built: 1975-2000, 1950-1974, 1925-1949, 1900-1924, 1875-1899, 1850-1874, 1825-1849
- Architect: Multiple
- Architectural style: Greek Revival, Queen Anne, Federal, Queen Anne
- NRHP reference No.: 83003443
- Added to NRHP: June 16, 1983

Centennial Neighborhood District is a national historic district located at Lafayette, Indiana, United States. The area originated as the Bartholomew and Davis Additions to Lafayette in 1829. Growth came rapidly after the Wabash and Erie Canal arrived in 1843, and continued with the arrival of the railroad in 1853. The Centennial Neighborhood Historic District takes its name from the Centennial School, which was constructed in 1876 on the centennial of the nation. The school was located on the northeast corner of Brown Street at North 6th Street. It has since been removed and a park was created at its original location.

== History ==
The area began to grow in the 1830s as the boundaries of Lafayette expanded north and east of the Wabash River. It was the introduction of the Wabash Canal in 1843 that led to rapid growth. The canal followed the route of Canal Road and the current tracks on the west side of the neighborhood. The area began to develop mills, warehouses and wharves serving the canal. The Reverend Samuel Johnson built a house in 1844 on the north east corner of Ferry and Sixth Streets, which is the oldest structure in the district. The following year, 1844, Richard DeHart House was constructed at 602 N. Fifth Street (northeast corner of Cincinnati and Fifth Streets). The canal growth came to a close with the arrival of the railroads in 1853. Five existing houses represent the canal era, located at 716 and 729 Brown Street, 636 Ferry Street and 713-715 North Fourth Street.

The Lafayette and Indianapolis Railroad (L&I) was the first railroad to arrive in Lafayette in 1852. It ended on Main Street near the current Amtrak Depot, in the Downtown Historic District several blocks south of the neighborhood. The New Albany and Salem Railroad, later called the Monon Railroad, arrived in 1853; this followed Fifth Street and began the growth of the area. The following year, 1854, the Wabash Railroad cut an angle along the Erie Street route, just east of the district. The railroads needed housing for their crews. The row house at 417-427 North Fourth Street (1870) is representative of the housing built during this boom.

More affluent residences were built along Ferry Street. Outstanding examples include the Handley House (874) at 632-634 Ferry Street and the Oppenheimer House at 604 North Sixth Street.

It was in this district that religious and educational structures predominated. St. John's Episcopal Church was built from 1851 to 1858, and is the district's oldest surviving church. St. James Lutheran Church, Trinity Methodist Episcopal Church and St. Boniface Catholic Church were built during the 1860s and 1870s in the Gothic Revival style. Bethel African Methodist Episcopal Church began as Lafayette's first black school. The Albert A. Wells Memorial Public Library was built in 1928 and is an outstanding example of the Neoclassical style.

The district was listed on the National Register of Historic Places in 1983.

== Significant structures ==
- 1844, Reverend Samuel Johnson House, 608 Ferry St.
- 1849, Bethel African Methodist Episcopal Church, 820 Ferry St.
- 1858, St. James Evangelical Lutheran Church, 800 Cincinnati Street
- 1858, St. Johns Episcopal Church, 600 Ferry Street
- 1865, St. Boniface Catholic Church, 318 N 9th Street
- 1869, Trinity United Methodist Church, 404 N 6th Street
- 1872, First Baptist Church, 411 N 7th Street St.
- 1876, Centennial School (demolished), 2007 Centennial Park, Centennial Park, 501 N 6th Street
- 1893, Pottlitzer House, 801 Brown St.
- 1893, Wallace Bros. Building, 320 - 328 Ferry St.
- 1901, Monon Depot (Civic Theatre of Greater Lafayette), 328 N 5th Street
- 1908, St. Boniface Catholic School, 815 North Street
- 1913, First Christian Church, 329 N 6th Street
- 1914, Haywood Printing Company, 300 North 5th St.
- 1916, Sons of Abraham Synagogue, 661 North 7th St.
- 1928, Albert A. Wells Memorial Library, 638 North Street
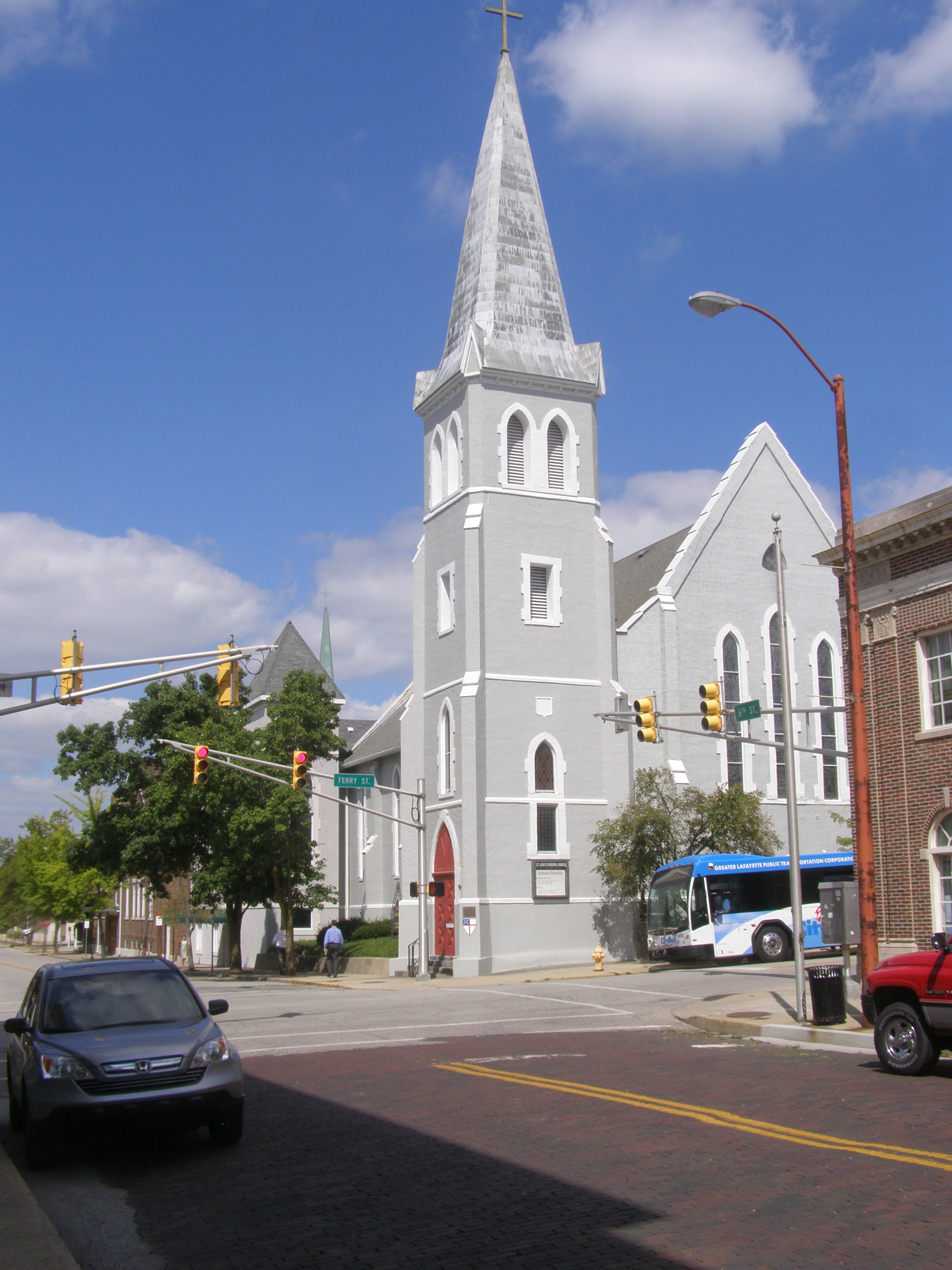
1858, St. Johns Episcopal Church, 600 Ferry Street, Lafayette, Indiana

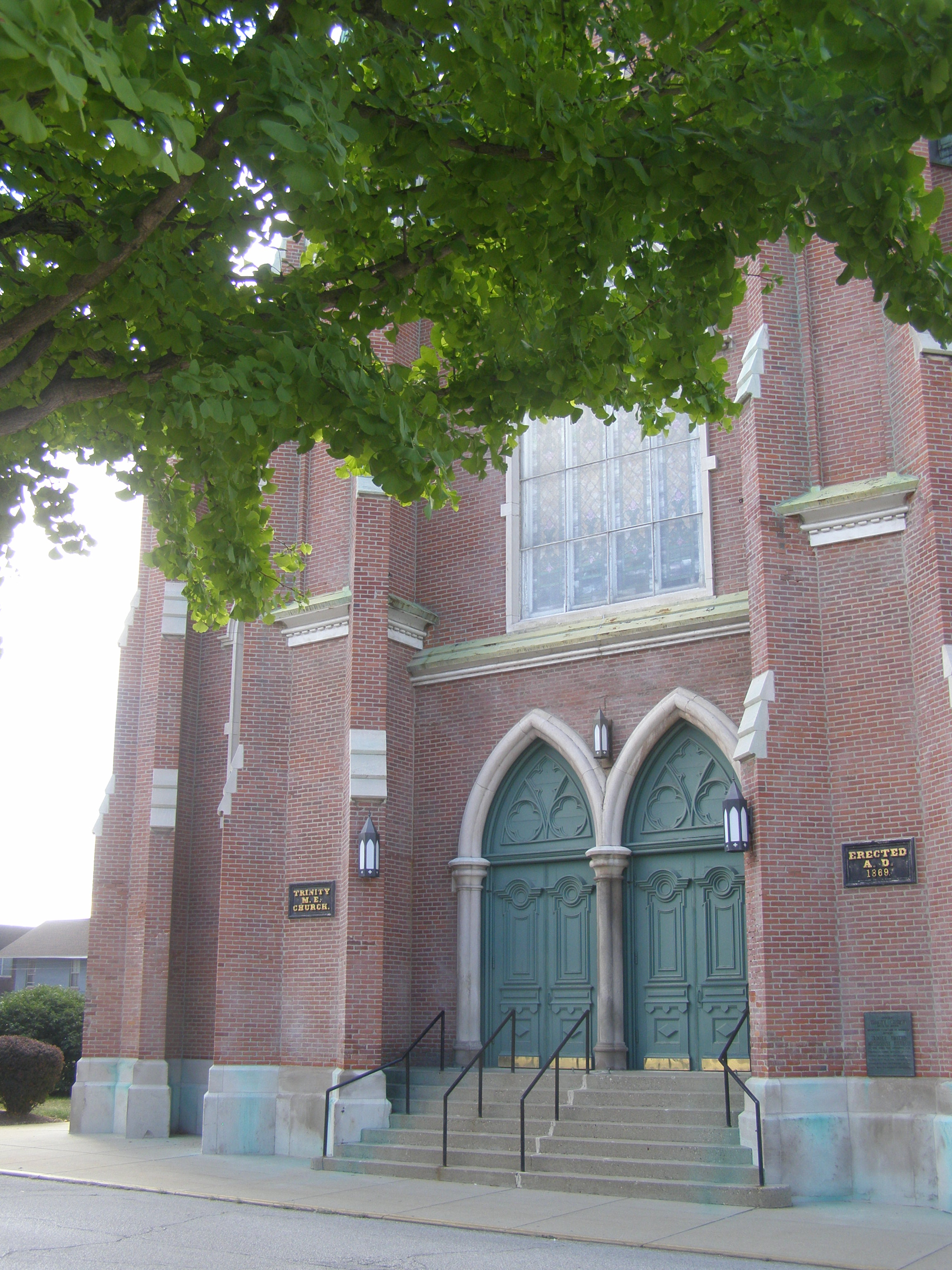
1869, Trinity United Methodist Church, 404 N 6th Street, Lafayette, Indiana

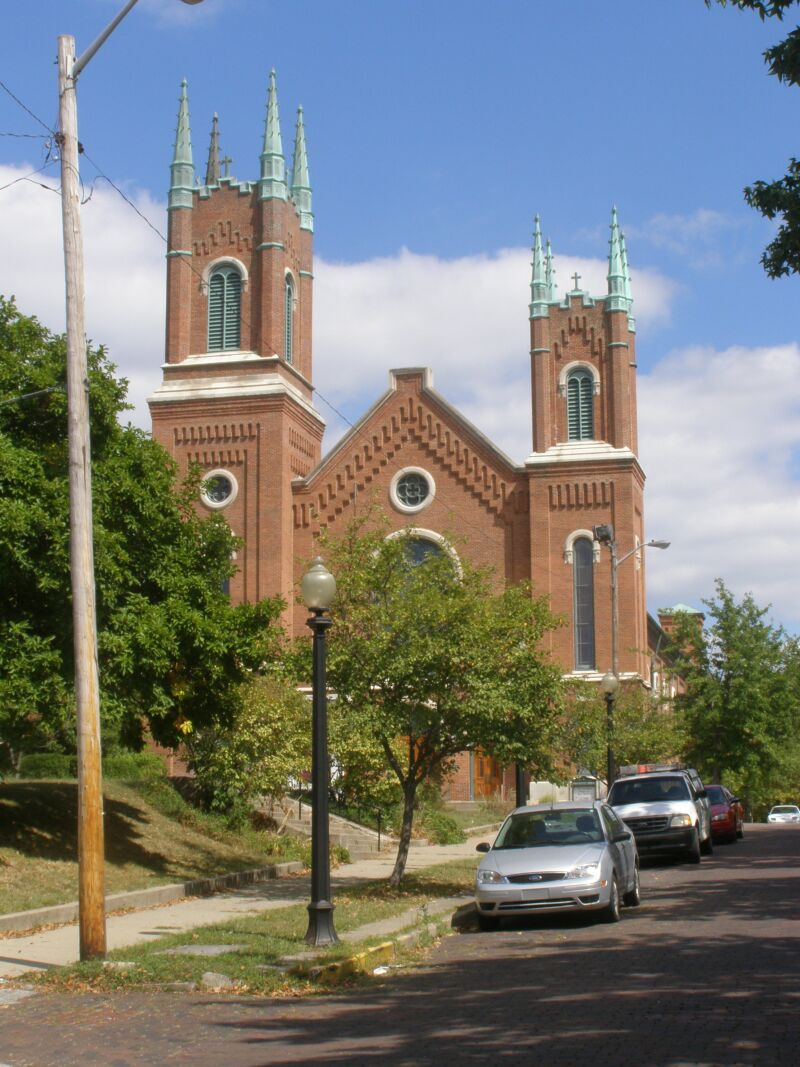
1872, First Baptist Church, 411 N 7th Street St, Lafayette, Indiana

== See also ==
- Downtown Lafayette Historic District
- Ellsworth Historic District
- Highland Park Neighborhood Historic District
- Jefferson Historic District
- Park Mary Historic District
- Perrin Historic District
- St. Mary Historic District
- Upper Main Street Historic District

== Sources ==
- Interim Report Tippecanoe County Interim Report, Indiana Historic Sites and Structures Inventory; Historic Landmarks Foundation of Indiana; 1990
