= Erin Easter =

American politician

Mayor of West Lafayette, Indiana
- Incumbent
- Assumed office January 1, 2024
- Preceded by: John Dennis

Personal details
- Party: Democratic

Erin Easter (born 1982 or 1983) is the current mayor of West Lafayette, Indiana, United States.

== Education ==
Easter attended Lafayette Jefferson High School, and earned both a bachelor's and master's degree in communications from Purdue University.

== Career ==
Easter's first foray into politics was as a field organizer for Barack Obama's 2008 presidential campaign in Ohio. After returning to Indiana, she moved to West Lafayette and worked for Greater Lafayette Commerce starting in 2009.

In 2018, Easter became the city's Deputy Director of Development, and in 2020, she was promoted to Director of Development.

After working closely with then-mayor John Dennis Jr. for several years, Dennis was diagnosed with Alzheimer's disease and suggested to Easter that she run for mayor. Easter, a Democrat, announced her campaign in December 2022, and in November 2023 she ran for mayor unopposed.

Easter was sworn in as mayor on December 28, 2023, officially starting her term on January 1, 2024.

== Personal life ==
Easter lives in New Chauncey, West Lafayette with her husband and children.
