= University Farm =

University Farm may refer to:

- University farms, a subclass of campus farms
- University Farm (Indiana), a residential neighborhood in the city of West Lafayette, Indiana, named for its proximity to Purdue University
- University Farm (Nottinghamshire), a commercial research farm attached to the Sutton Bonington Campus of the University of Nottingham, England
- University Farm, the original name of University of California, Davis
