= Morton School =

Morton School may refer to:

- Morton School (West Lafayette, Indiana), a historic school building in West Lafayette, Indiana, US
- Morton Primary School, in Morton, Derbyshire
- Morton High School (Morton, Illinois), in Morton, Illinois, USA.
- Schools in the J. Sterling Morton High School District 201 in Cook County, Illinois, US:
  - J. Sterling Morton High School East, in Cicero
  - J. Sterling Morton High School West, in Berwyn
- Richard Rose Morton Academy, formerly Morton School, Carlisle, Cumbria, England
