= Curtis–Grace House =

Historic house in Indiana, United States

- U.S. National Register of Historic Places
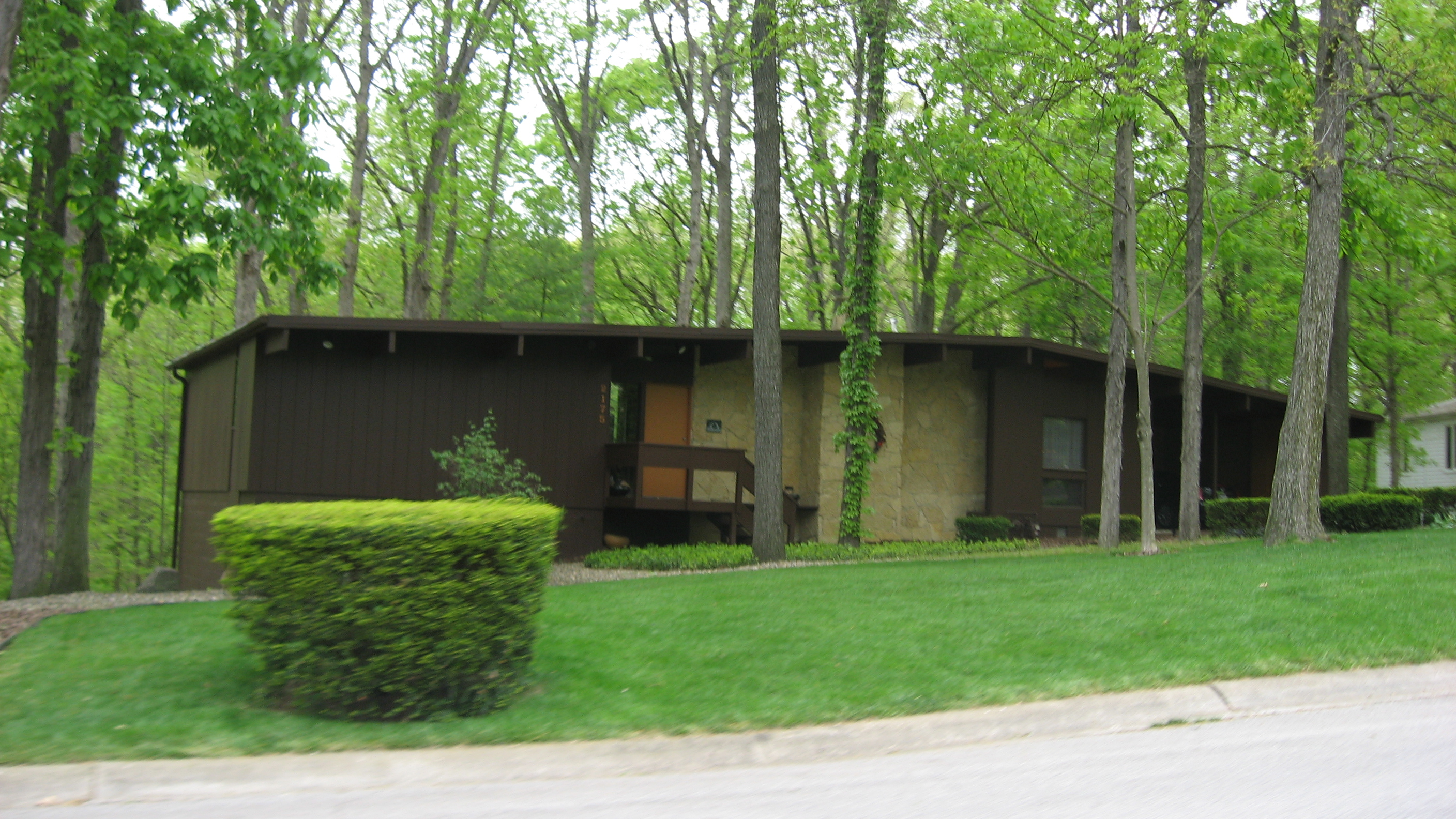
- Curtis–Grace House, April 2012

- Location within Tippecanoe County, Indiana Location within Indiana Location within the United States
- Location: 2175 Tecumseh Park Ln., West Lafayette, Indiana
- Coordinates: 40°26′50″N 86°54′27″W
- Area: 0.53 acres (0.21 ha)
- Built: 1958
- Architect: Smith, Robert J.; Turner, Robert L.
- Architectural style: Modern Movement
- NRHP reference No.: 12000190
- Added to NRHP: April 10, 2012

Curtis–Grace House, also known as the Roy and Leona Curtis House and Richard and Connie Grace House, is a historic home located at West Lafayette, Indiana. It was built in 1958, and is a two-story, banked, post-and-beam Modern Movement style dwelling, with a broad, low-pitched offset gable roof. It is constructed of concrete block, redwood, natural stone, and plate glass. The overall dimensions are approximately 82 feet by 23 feet. The surrounding landscaped property is a contributing site.

It was listed on the National Register of Historic Places in 2012.
