= Happy Hollow Heights Historic District =

Historic district in Indiana, United States

- U.S. National Register of Historic Places
- U.S. Historic district
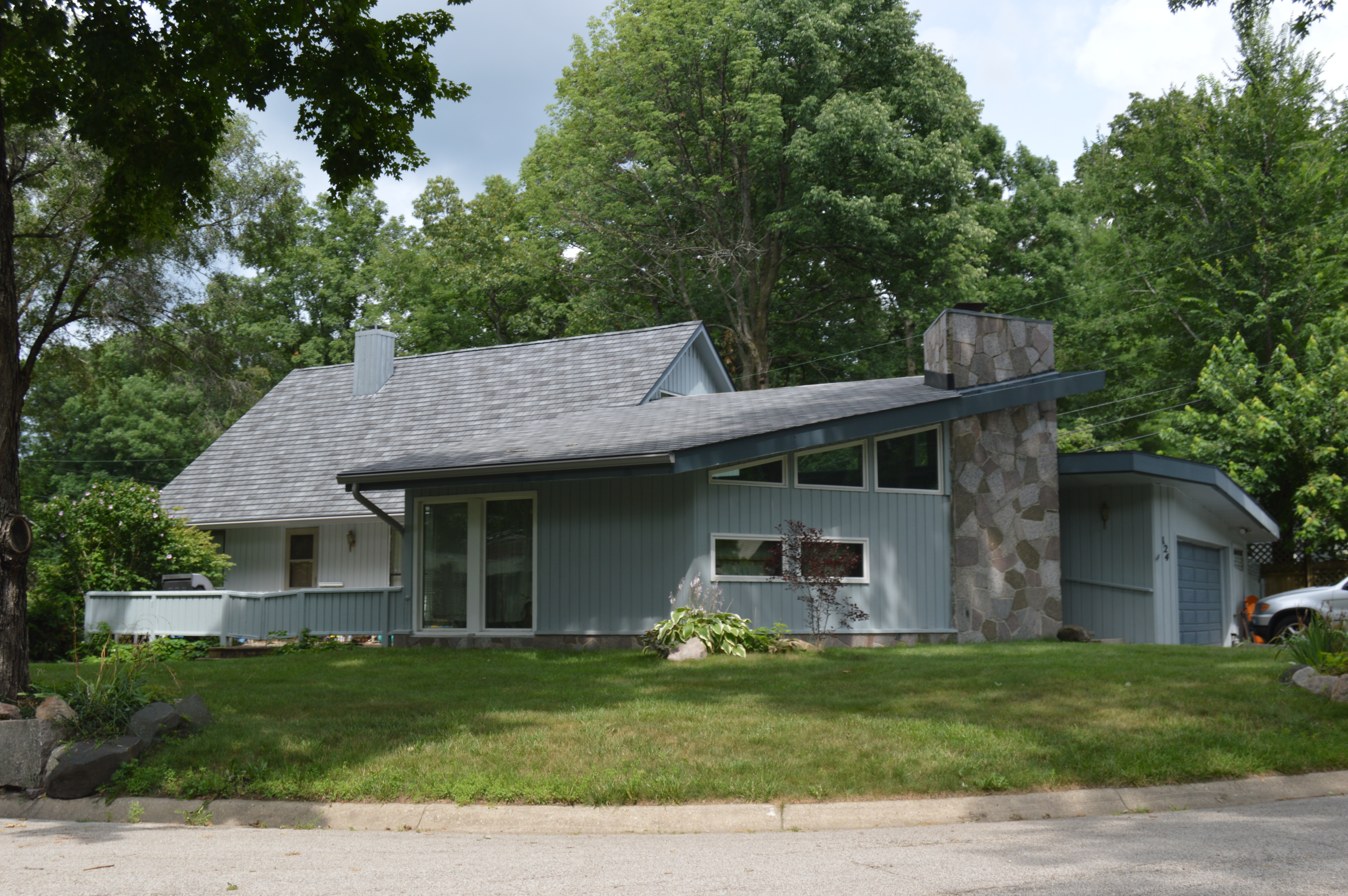
- House at the end of Sumac Drive

- Location within Tippecanoe County, Indiana Location within Indiana Location within the United States
- Location: 1821 and 1809 Happy Hollow Rd. and all houses on Laurel, Hollowood, Fearnleaf, and Sumac Drs., West Lafayette, Indiana
- Coordinates: 40°26′36″N 86°54′01″W
- Area: 26.1 acres (10.6 ha)
- Architectural style: Ranch, Modern, Split-level
- NRHP reference No.: 15000891
- Added to NRHP: December 15, 2015

Happy Hollow Heights Historic District is a national historic district located in West Lafayette, Indiana. The district encompasses 54 contributing buildings in a predominantly planned residential section of Lafayette, platted in 1953 and expanded in 1958. It developed between about 1953 and 1967 and includes representative examples of Ranch, Modern, and Split-level style architecture.

It was listed on the National Register of Historic Places in 2015.

== See also ==
- Chauncey-Stadium Avenues Historic District
- Hills and Dales Historic District
