= Chauncey–Stadium Avenues Historic District =

Historic district in Indiana, United States

- U.S. National Register of Historic Places
- U.S. Historic district
- Location within Tippecanoe County, Indiana Location within Indiana Location within the United States
- Location: Roughly bounded by Meridian and Lincoln, River Rd., Fowler and Quincy, Northwestern and Allen Sts., West Lafayette, Indiana
- Coordinates: 40°25′52″N 86°54′22″W
- Area: 160 acres (65 ha)
- Architect: Sears, Roebuck, & Co.; Van Tine, Gordon
- Architectural style: Queen Anne, Shingle Style, et al.
- NRHP reference No.: 02001558
- Added to NRHP: December 20, 2002

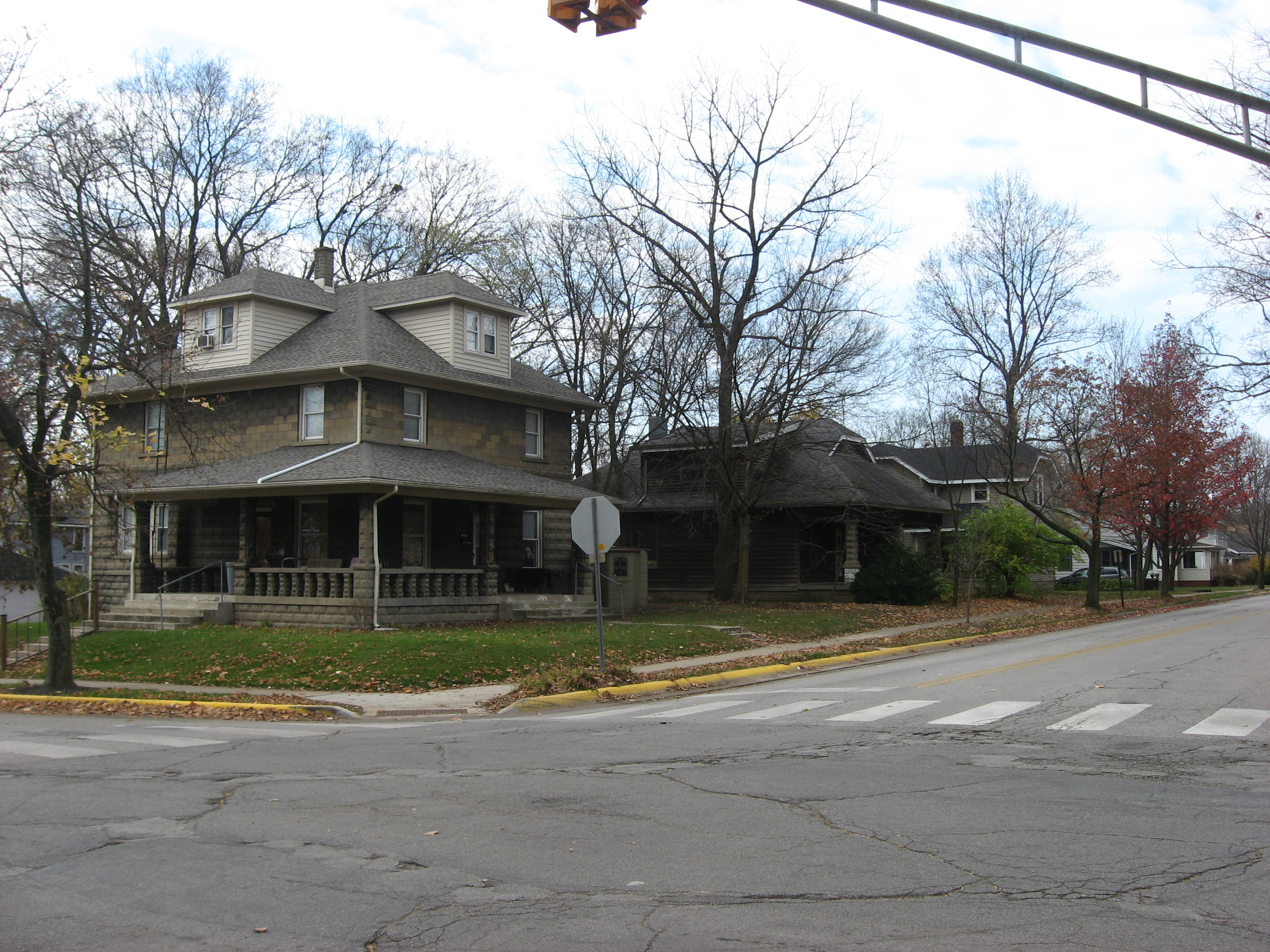
Houses on the southern side of the 100 block of Stadium Avenue

Chauncey–Stadium Avenues Historic District, also known as the West Lafayette Historic District, is a national historic district located at West Lafayette, Indiana. The district encompasses 644 contributing buildings in a predominantly residential section of West Lafayette. It developed between about 1890 and 1952 and includes representative examples of Queen Anne, Shingle style, Colonial Revival, Tudor Revival, and Bungalow / American Craftsman style architecture.

It was listed on the National Register of Historic Places in 2002.

== See also ==
- Happy Hollow Heights Historic District
- Hills and Dales Historic District
