= John Dennis (mayor) =

American politician

Mayor of West Lafayette, Indiana
- In office 2008–2023
- Succeeded by: Erin Easter

Personal details
- Party: Republican
- Education: Indiana State University

John Dennis is an American politician and former police officer who served as the mayor of West Lafayette, Indiana from 2008 to 2023. He is known for annexing Purdue University into the city limits of West Lafayette and for improving relations between the town and university. Before entering politics, he had served in the Lafayette Police Department for 23 years, attaining the rank of deputy chief. Even though he is a Republican and had been praised by conservative Mitch Daniels, he crossed party lines in being one of 12 Indiana mayors to oppose a ban of same-sex marriage in 2014, and in signing the Mayors' Climate Agreement to design infrastructure to mitigate climate change.
