= Hills and Dales Historic District =

Historic district in Indiana, United States

- U.S. National Register of Historic Places
- U.S. Historic district
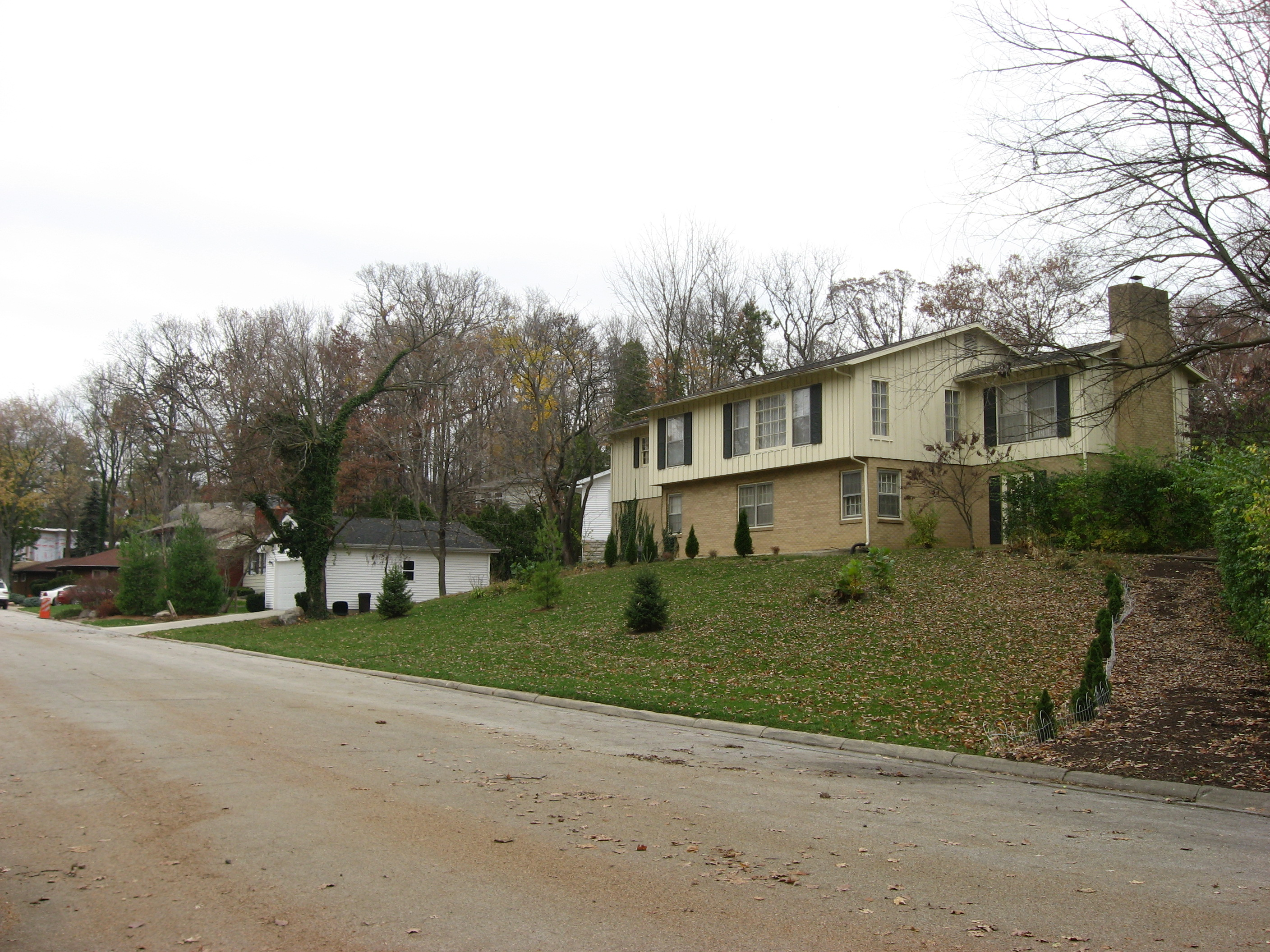
- Hills and Dales Historic District, November 2009

- Location within Tippecanoe County, Indiana Location within Indiana Location within the United States
- Location: Roughly bounded by Northwestern Ave., Meridian St., Hillcrest Rd., and Grant St., West Lafayette, Indiana
- Coordinates: 40°26′07″N 86°54′49″W
- Area: 22 acres (8.9 ha)
- Architect: Nichol, Scholer, and Hoffman; Sears and Roebuck
- Architectural style: Colonial Revival, Tudor Revival, et al.
- NRHP reference No.: 02000689
- Added to NRHP: June 27, 2002

Hills and Dales Historic District is a national historic district located at West Lafayette, Indiana. The district encompasses 136 contributing buildings and 39 noncontributing buildings in a predominantly residential section of Lafayette, platted in 1922–1924. It developed between about 1911 and 1951 and includes representative examples of Colonial Revival, Tudor Revival, French Renaissance, and Ranch style architecture. Notable contributing buildings include the Haniford House (1911, 1919), Herbert Graves House, (c. 1938–1939), and Marion J. Eaton House (c. 1940–1941).

It was listed on the National Register of Historic Places in 2002.

== See also ==
- Chauncey-Stadium Avenues Historic District
- Happy Hollow Heights Historic District
