= Samara (house) =

Historic house in Indiana, United States

- John E. and Catherine E. Christian House (Samara)
- U.S. National Register of Historic Places
- U.S. National Historic Landmark
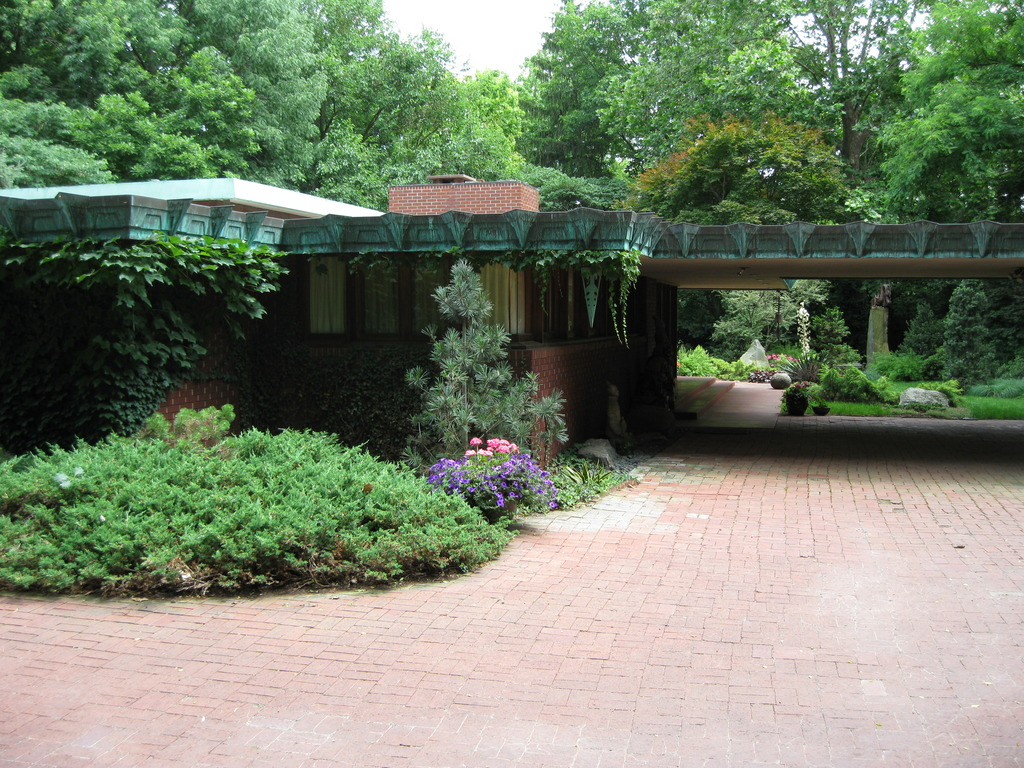

- Location within Tippecanoe County, Indiana Location within Indiana Location within the United States
- Location: West Lafayette, Indiana
- Coordinates: 40°26′18.8″N 86°54′59.6″W
- Built: 1956
- Architect: Frank Lloyd Wright; Frank Woods
- Architectural style: Modern Movement
- NRHP reference No.: 92000679

Significant dates
- Added to NRHP: June 16, 1992
- Designated NHL: February 27, 2015

Samara (a.k.a. the John E. Christian House) is a Usonian-style historic house museum in West Lafayette, Indiana, United States. Designed by Frank Lloyd Wright, Samara was completed in 1956 for Purdue University professor John E. Christian and his family. The single-story house spans about 2,200 square feet (200 m^{2}) and uses materials such as brick, concrete, and glass. Its nickname comes from the samara, a type of winged seed that is depicted throughout the house's decorations. The house has been praised over the years for its Usonian-style decorations and is designated as a National Historic Landmark.

Samara occupies a sloping triangular site that spans about 1 acre (0.40 ha). Its landscape decorations include a driveway, lanai, ravine, living-room terrace, and courtyard garden. The facade is made of brick, mahogany, and plate glass. The roof is on two levels, divided by clerestory windows with mahogany boards, and there is a carport extending over the main entrance. The interior uses materials such as brick, concrete, glass, and mahogany and is arranged on a grid of 4-by-4-foot (1.2 by 1.2 m) squares. The entrance foyer leads to three bedrooms, two bathrooms, and a nursery to the northwest, along with a two-tiered living room to the southeast. The house also includes a dining room to the northeast and a workspace (consisting of a kitchen and laundry room) at the center.

John and his wife Catherine contacted Wright to design the house in 1950, but development took several years because the family was not in a rush to design the house. Design work began in 1953, and construction began in 1955; the family moved in on September 7, 1956. Because of the Christian family's monetary shortfalls, the design was not complete when they moved in, and various architectural elements were added over the decades. John Christian, who began giving tours of Samara in 1988, occupied the house until his death in 2015. Tours continued after John's death, and the house underwent renovations in the early 2020s.

== Site ==
Samara, also known as the John E. Christian House, is located at 1301 Woodland Avenue in the Woodland Heights neighborhood of West Lafayette, Indiana, United States. The site is roughly triangular and occupies about 1 acre (0.40 ha). The house is surrounded by other houses, each also occupying about one acre, near the campus of Purdue University. Its architect, Frank Lloyd Wright, oriented the house to maintain the existing topography and to take advantage of sunlight.

The parcel slopes down from west to east. There is an elevation change of about 14 feet (4.3 m) between Northwestern Avenue on its southwest border (at the Purdue campus's eastern boundary) and Woodland Avenue on its southeast border. Woodland Avenue, which was originally intended to connect to Northwestern Avenue, dead ends at the house's entrance; the house occupies the right-of-way originally intended for Woodland Avenue. The house is positioned below Northwestern Avenue, allowing noise from traffic to pass above it.

=== Landscape design ===
Before the house was built, there were about three dozen trees on the property, most of which were evergreens. When Wright designed Samara, he directed the Christian family to add a larger variety of plantings throughout the grounds. The plantings are divided into five zones, which adjoin a driveway, lanai, ravine, living-room terrace, and courtyard garden. Many of the plantings are Asian-inspired. The grounds are illuminated by twelve copper lanterns, which have perforations shaped like the samara, a type of winged seed found in a pinecone.

The entrance driveway from Woodland Avenue is denoted by a custom-designed gate (which is made of iron) and a lamppost. There is a brick planter next to the gate, which has juniper plants and a Philippine-mahogany mailbox. The driveway itself is paved with pinkish brick. It was originally made of gravel, but the original owners, John and Catherine (Kay) Christian, paved the driveway in 1960 based on plans by Wright. The lanai, a grassy area at the northeast corner, is the only curved design element in the house; it is surrounded by a brick wall. The original plans for the lanai included a reflecting pool, which was not installed during the 20th century.

The southern portion of the site includes a ravine, located between the house itself and higher ground to the southeast. The ravine is filled with preexisting evergreen trees, along with plantings the Christians added. At the house's eastern corner is the L-shaped living room terrace, extending outward from the house's floor slab. The terrace is surrounded by a low brick parapet. and is covered by a pergola of steel beams, which are clad with Philippine mahogany and are supported by Cherokee-red poles. There is also a triangular courtyard garden, which is level with the house and is surrounded by trees.

== Architecture ==
Samara was designed by Frank Lloyd Wright in the Usonian style and opened in 1956. The house's nickname comes from the samara's winged seed. Motifs of winged seeds (samarae) were placed throughout the house, including in the clerestory windows, dining chairs, living room rug, and lamps. The house also incorporates over 40 design details that are shared by Wright's other houses. Among these are Usonian design elements such as a flat roof, a carport, and terraces, as well as recessed illumination and underfloor heating. Samara is one of a few major examples of contemporary architecture in West Lafayette, along with the Purdue State Bank, designed by Wright's mentor Louis Sullivan.

Both the exterior and interior are constructed out of red brick and mahogany, since Wright, a proponent of organic architecture, wanted to use natural materials in the design. The use of mahogany was intended to match what Wright described as "the elegance" of Catherine Christian, one of the original owners. The house is arranged around a grid of squares measuring 48 inches (1,200 mm) wide. It is built on a concrete floor slab, which is 4 inches (100 mm) thick and is tinted Cherokee red; this pigment was created by sprinkling powder into the concrete while it was still drying.

The Christian family was not initially able to purchase all of the specified custom details, but they made an agreement with Wright to continue adding to the home as their budget allowed. Many of the decorative details were thus designed so they could be added later on. The Christian family maintained the home according to Wright's exacting specifications.

=== Exterior ===
==== Facade ====
The longest elevations of the facade are to the northwest and southeast. (Note: The descriptions in National Park Service 2015 are rotated slightly counterclockwise from the true orientation; for example, this source refers to features in the northwest as being positioned to the "north". The true orientation of the floor layout is shown in Storrer 1993, p. 403, where northwest is at the top of the diagram.) Like other Usonian houses, Samara uses both glass and solid walls in its facade. The brickwork, manufactured nearby in Attica, Indiana, is arranged that only its horizontal joints are recessed; the vertical joints are flush with the brick, but none of the joints are painted. The trim around the windows and doors is made of Philippine mahogany. The mitred glass windows are 1/4 inch (6.4 mm) thick and lack visible vertical mullions at the house's corners, allowing the windows to wrap around the facade.

The main entrance is hidden under the carport.

The northwestern elevation is accessed from Woodland Avenue's dead end. It has a curving driveway from the east, which leads to a carport on the southwestern elevation, measuring two cars wide. The carport's roof is supported on its far end by a standalone brick garden shed. The main doorway is concealed under the carport, occupying the southeastern wall of a protrusion on the house's southwestern elevation. This doorway is flanked by fixed-pane plate glass and movable casement windows, which are the only openings in the solid brick wall.

At the house's northern corner are fixed-pane and casement windows (which wrap around a corner), along with full-height glass doors. The northeastern elevation is mostly clad in horizontally arranged bricks and has a wide central section, flanked by recessed step-backs in the wall. These step-backs create corners that abut the guest room, master bedroom, and dining room from north to south. The dining room, at the center of the northeastern elevation, has a plate-glass door and wrap-around window. The easternmost portion of the northeastern elevation (adjacent to the dining room), along with the southeastern elevation, are connected by a wrap-around glass window. Both elevations have full-height doors and windows made of plate glass, which open onto the lanai and terrace. The southeastern wall is interrupted by two load-bearing horizontally-patterned brick walls.

==== Roof ====
The roof is supported by steel beams, some of which are embedded into the glass walls. Its eaves protrude significantly from the facade and are clad with off-white gypsum board and plaster on their soffits, or undersides. These eaves allowed sunlight to warm the house during the winter, when the sun was low in the sky, while shading the house during the summer, when the sun was higher. The surface of the roof consists of tar and pitch with white marble gravel, which was intended to carry rainwater toward drains at each corner. Wright did not add downspouts below the roof, since he wanted water to cascade downward in warmer weather and freeze up in colder weather.

Parts of the roof are raised above the main roof, and clerestory windows with Philippine mahogany trim are inserted between the two levels. Both sides of each clerestory window contain Philippine mahogany screens with samara-shaped perforations. The boards each measure 4 by 1 foot (1.22 by 0.30 m) across and have mitered corners, allowing them to be placed on both sides of the wrap-around corner windows. Similarly patterned screens were used on the Bachman–Wilson House, another Wright-designed Usonian home. The clerestory windows themselves allowed the house to be ventilated naturally.

The edges of the roof have a decorative fascia made of copper. The upper roof's fascia dates from 1960, while the fascia for the rest of the roof was not added until 1991, replacing the original wood fascia. The copper fascia consists of interlocking rectangular panels and embossed geometric shapes, which create a textured sawtooth-like motif. These motifs cast differently-shaped shadows depending on the time of day. Although it typically took 20 to 30 years for a fascia to weather to a blue-green patina, Wright wanted the weathering to be accelerated, so John Christian devised a copper sulfate mixture to achieve this.

=== Interior ===
The house's decorations were custom designs by Wright.

The house spans about 2,200 square feet (200 m^{2}) and uses materials such as brick walls, concrete floors, glass windows, and mahogany trim. The floor slab is scored, with grooves denoting the floor grid. Embedded under the floor slab is a gravity heating system with 1/2-inch-diameter (1.3 cm) copper pipes; this system is more intricate than similar systems at Wright's other Usonian buildings. The pipes in Samara's gravity heating system are spaced 3 inches (76 mm) apart at the house's perimeter and twice that distance in other parts of the house.

Wright specified or designed the furniture and furnishings inside. The living and dining rooms originally contained mass-produced chairs and tables designed by Wright and made by the Heritage-Henredon Company, though Wright also created custom furniture, which the Christians constructed gradually. Wright picked the house's drapery patterns, which came from a design line he had designed for the F. Schumacher Company. He also designed the tableware and cutlery, including porcelains with multicolored motifs to hide lipstick stains. Wright devised other objects such as wastebaskets, planters, candlesticks, and curtains. Items such as a five-tiered lamp are inspired by pinecone motifs. Wright concealed the house's televisions because he felt they were unattractive, and he designed movable television trays.

Many decorations and furnishings are inspired by Japanese architecture, in accordance with Wright's wishes that Asian decorations be incorporated into the house. Samara's decorations also include geometric patterns, and some of the furniture can be stacked or rearranged to create additional seats and tables. The color palette of furniture and design details is brighter and more saturated than other examples of Wright's architecture, since Catherine Christian had wanted brighter colors. Wright originally opposed using such a bright palette, but his wife Olgivanna convinced him otherwise. The original palette consisted of citrus colors interspersed with green, orange, and yellow, but this was replaced in the 1970s with a brighter palette. In deference to Wright's preferences that his clients enjoy the nature, the Christians did not hang any pictures on the walls.

==== Foyer ====
The southwestern elevation's entrance leads to a foyer with a carpeted floor. The walls of the foyer have several doors leading to coat and storage closets. The ceiling is 6 2/3 feet (2.0 m) high, lower than the other rooms in the house, creating a compression and release effect that was common to Wright's other work. The foyer is positioned in the middle of the southwestern elevation, leading off to the house's communal spaces (i.e. living and dining rooms) and its private bedrooms. A bedroom hallway runs north of the foyer, and the living room opens to the south.

==== Living room ====
The living room, occupying much of the house's southeastern end, measures 24 by 24 feet (7.3 by 7.3 m) across. The space was designed to accommodate 50 or 60 people and is divided into seating tiers. The lower tier is at the same level as the living-room terrace and has glass doors and full-height windows leading out onto the terrace. There is also a series of hassocks and coffee tables; some of the coffee tables can be pulled apart to create additional seating. The northwestern wall of the lower tier has a fireplace, which is made of brick and has a cantilevered corner, an iron grate, and a kettle arm. Wright wished to avoid the impression that the lower tier was a fully-enclosed conversation pit, so the lower tier is surrounded by raised floors only on two sides: the upper tier to the southwest, and the dining room to the northeast. The steps between the lower tier and the raised floors can be used as additional seating.

The living room's upper tier adjoins the entry hall. There is a built-in banquette on the upper tier, which can fit 15–20 people and has storage space and upholstered seats. Shelves with lighting run along the wall adjacent to the banquette. The living room has a cabinet with a retractable television and concealed speakers. Additional speakers are placed in the living room's ceiling, which is part of the house's upper roof. The ceiling measures 9 10/12 feet (3.0 m) high, though due to the varying floor heights, it is as low as 6 2/3 feet (2.0 m) above the room's perimeter.

==== Dining room and workspace ====
Steps from the living room's lower tier up to the dining room

In contrast to other Usonian houses with combined living–dining rooms, Samara has a standalone dining room, which occupies a slightly protruding nook on the house's northeastern elevation. The dining room is slightly above the living room. The nook's eastern corner has a brick wall, while the northern corner contains glass doors and full-height windows. There is a hatch on one wall, through which decorative objects and dishes could be conveyed. There are also dimmable lights and wall shelves. Wright designed 13 copies of armless chairs for Samara's dining room, anticipating that one could be displayed in a museum; John Christian commissioned 12 of these chairs in 1989. The chairs have white upholstery, cutouts in the chair, rudder-like balancers at their bases, and Philippine-mahogany frames.

At the center of the house, behind the living-room fireplace and adjoining the dining room, is a room that Wright referred to as "workspace", a name Wright usually gave to his houses' kitchens. It consists of a kitchen and laundry room of similar size. The workspace has plastic countertops with storage drawers beneath, a series of cabinets above the counter, a mahogany utility cart, and a mahogany hutch. The utility cart could be raised to the level of the workspace counter or lowered to serve the dining room. The kitchen is in the eastern half of the workspace and originally had kitchen appliances from the Christian family's previous house. The kitchen ceiling, measuring 8 10/12 feet (2.7 m) high, has recessed lighting and louvered clerestory windows. The western half of the workspace is used as the laundry room. It includes mahogany cabinets, broom closet, a sink, and laundry appliances. The two sections of the workspace are separated by a mahogany partition, and folding mahogany screens separate it from the dining room to the east and the boiler room and bedroom hallway to the west.

==== Private spaces ====
The hallway

The private wing is in the house's northeastern section and is accessed by the hallway. The hallway is narrow, with board-and-batten walls; the eastern wall conceals storage space. Proceeding north from the foyer, the hallway is flanked by a bathroom and nursery room to the west and a master bedroom to the east; there is a guest bedroom at the end of the hall. The original plans also called for a half-bath, which was removed in the final design to enlarge the bathroom and nursery. The hallway and all rooms in the private wing have ceilings measuring 6 2/3 feet (2.0 m) high, except the master bedroom and the guest bathroom, which has a ceiling 8 10/12 feet (2.7 m) high.

The bathroom has mahogany cabinets, a toilet, a sink within a ceramic-tile countertop, a mirror above the sink, and a mahogany bathing nook with a tub. There are windows beneath the carport roof and incandescent light fixtures on the ceiling. The nursery to the north was intended for the Christians' daughter, Linda, and has recessed lights and a closet. Brick is used for the southwest and northwest walls—which adjoin the facade and are interrupted by windows wrapping around the corner—while boards and battens are used for the other walls. The nursery was originally outfitted with a movable desk and shelves on the northeast wall; as Linda grew, these were replaced with other furniture from the Christians' previous residence or with new furniture.

The master bedroom has closets on its southeast wall, with both conventional clothes rails and sliding trays. Wright designed a large platform bed, two cantilevered nightstands, and two sets of drawers, all made of Philippine mahogany. There are also clerestory windows on the northeast and northwest walls, along with full-height doors and windows leading out to the lanai. The guest bedroom has two smaller platform beds, two bedside tables, and a dressing table with a mirror, all made of Philippine mahogany. The guest room has a brick wall to the northwest, a corner window and full-height doors overlooking the lanai to the northeast, and board-and-batten walls elsewhere. The guest bedroom has an ensuite bathroom. The guest bathroom has board-and-batten walls, high clerestory windows at the ceiling, a toilet, a sink, and a tub with shower.

== History ==
Frank Lloyd Wright designed Samara near the end of his career. Starting in the late 1930s, Wright had designed lower-cost Usonian houses for middle-class families. In general, his Usonian houses tended to have open plans, geometric floor grids, in-floor heating, and a carport, without a garage or basement. By the 1950s, he was also busy with larger projects such as the Solomon R. Guggenheim Museum in New York, Beth Sholom Synagogue in Pennsylvania, Price Tower in Oklahoma, and the Marin County Civic Center in California. Compared with Wright's other 1950s commissions, Samara was relatively small.

=== Development ===
==== Commission ====
Samara was built for a young couple, Dr. John E. Christian and his wife Catherine (Kay) Christian. John was a pharmaceutical chemistry professor at Purdue University, and Catherine was a social director for the university during World War II. The Christians had become enamored of Wright's work in the 1940s. After marrying in 1948, they researched his designs for over two years. The same year, they bought a lot near Purdue University, which at 1 acre (0.40 ha) was much smaller than other lots for which Wright usually designed. They also had relatively little money, but as Wright was already in his 80s, they wanted to convince him to design a home while he was still alive. In 1949, they stayed over at another Wright-designed house in Okemos, Michigan, owned by one of Catherine's college roommates, Delores Edwards.

John first made a phone call to Taliesin, Wright's summer home in Spring Green, Wisconsin, in June 1950. He was able to speak directly to the architect, an unusual occurrence, as his three secretaries usually answered his calls. Wright's associate architects subsequently recalled that his secretary would have summarily rejected John's request if he learned that John wanted such a small design. Wright invited John and Catherine to Taliesin for an initial meeting later that month. Wright and the Christians quickly formed an affinity, and upon the Christians' second meeting with Wright that October, he agreed to take the job. The historian Wally Rogers cites several reasons for Wright's decision, including his affinity with the Christians, the couple's relative youth, low budget, and involvement in Purdue's social affairs.

The Christians and Wright worked together for the next six years. The Christians were not in any rush to move into the house, and they did not actually meet Wright again in person for several years, instead collaborating through Wright's secretary Eugene Masselink. In the interim, Catherine wrote a report detailing her needs for the house, which measured 27 pages long. (Note: Other sources characterized Catherine's report as 26 pages long.) This report was extremely precise, to the extent that it contained climate data for the area and a list of existing trees on the Christians' lots. By then, they also needed space for their newborn daughter, Linda. The Christian's next in-person meeting was in August 1953, upon which Wright's studio began making detailed design drawings.

==== Design and construction ====
During the design process, the Christians also consulted with the Mossberg family of South Bend, who had just moved into another Wright-designed residence. The Christians slept over at Taliesin several nights, and they visited Taliesin several times a year and made some visits to Wright's winter studio, Taliesin West. Conversely, Wright never actually visited the site while designing the Christian house, instead working off diagrams and sending his apprentice Edward Kipta to oversee the work. By early 1954, after six months of work, Wright had devised early plans for a house within a ravine. This plan was to contain a carport, two levels of roofs, a large living room, and overhanging eaves. Wright initially intended to clad the building in Indiana limestone, which was widely available in the area, but John subsequently found deposits of clay in the area. Wright's early drawings also called for a bedroom wing on Northwestern Avenue and plantings scattered across the grounds.

Several changes were made to the design before work started. Originally, the Christians wanted to be able to accommodate visitors; when Wright asked the couple how large they wanted the roof to be, they jokingly replied "50". After seeing the plans, the Christians wanted Wright to downsize the living room, to which Wright responded, "Sorry you feel L. R. too large. I’ve never yet seen one too large. If anything, yours is too small." After the Christians objected that the bedroom wing was too close to the street, Wright reoriented that wing. This modification prompted Wright to shift the house slightly southward and eliminated a study and a half-bath that had been part of the original plans. Wright had been reluctant to include the dining room but did so at Catherine's request. Although the Christians wanted a basement, Wright ultimately did not add the feature, as he had long disliked attics and basements. For the facade, Wright decided to use brick obtained from within 50 miles (80 km) of the house.

The Christians sought a construction contractor for their house, hiring A. Frank Woods, a self-taught local carpenter, after several months of searching. Woods, who was simultaneously working on other projects, agreed to build the house in exchange for 10% of the house's cost. Before work began, Woods and the Christians met with Wright once again, and they visited some of his other works including several houses and the First Unitarian Society of Madison. The design drawings were completed in January 1955, and John Christian first reviewed the plans on New Year's Day. Work began that April and took eighteen months to reach substantial completion. Kipta arrived in West Lafayette that June, overseeing the work for eight months. Masselink handled communications between Wright and his clients. During construction, John walked by the house to see the construction progress. The walls had been built by November, and a plastic tarp was erected to allow workers to continue fitting out the interior. The gravity heating system was being installed by early 1956.

=== Christian use ===
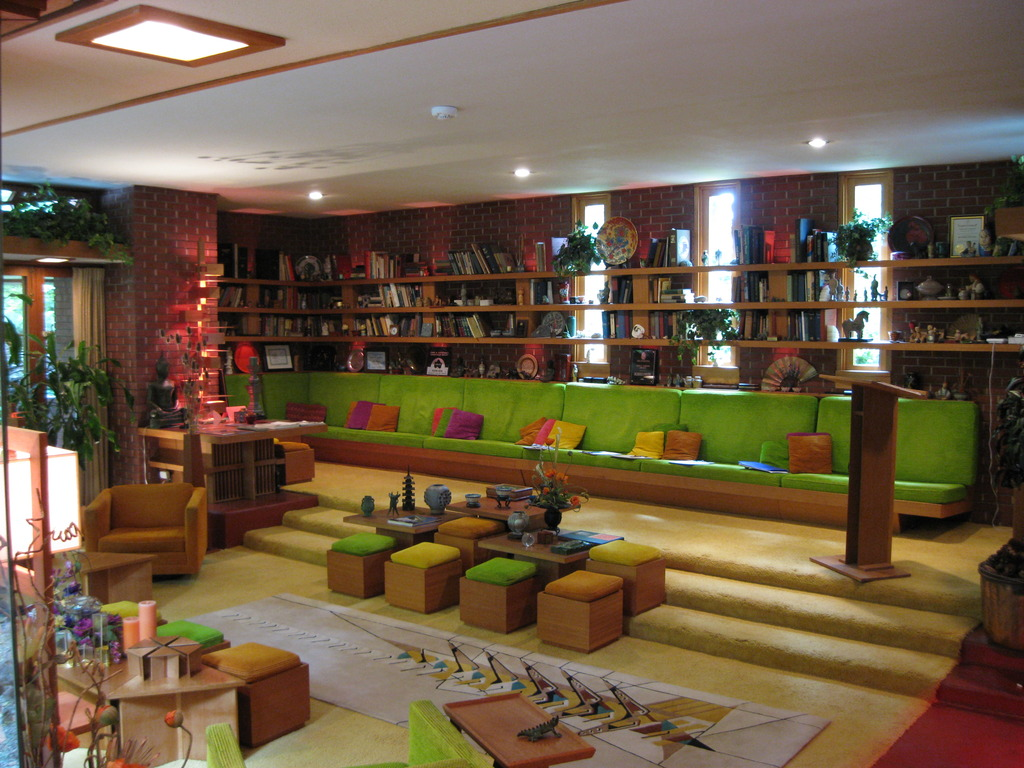
The living room features extensive built-ins and bright colors.

The Christians occupied the house on September 7, 1956. John did not know exactly how much Samara had cost, but he did say it was more than the Christians' original budget of $35,000 (equivalent to $361,000 in 2024). When the Christians moved in, they did not have space for all of Wright's decorations, which were instead placed in a self storage facility or exhibited internationally. The West Lafayette Public Library offered to store some of the decorations after learning about the self storage unit. John was so proud of the design that he wore neckties with Wright-inspired geometric patterns on them.

The house was still not technically finished when the Christians moved in. In the late 1950s, the Christians added landscaping features such as the gate, lanai, and planter. Wright died in 1959, and subsequent modifications to the house were overseen by Wright's associates. These included paving the driveway in brick during the 1960s. The Christians added a central air conditioning system to the house in 1967 and hired the Frank Lloyd Wright Foundation to update the color palette between 1972 and 1974. In the 1980s, lanterns were added in the garden. Catherine continued to live there until she died in 1986.

John continued to maintain the house in his retirement, after his wife's death. John continued to maintain the house's decorations exactly to Wright's specifications. Ted Osborn, an Illinois man who became friends with John, said the professor was meticulous in maintaining the grounds. John also opened his house to the public in 1988, working with several docents who gave tours. He put a guestbook at Samara's entrance and invited visitors to sit on his furniture and examine his furnishings. Additional modifications continued, including the installation of furniture such as a cabinet, entertainment center, living room carpet, lamps, and planters in the 1990s. The copper fascia was added to the roof in 1991, and John ordered a custom-made living-room carpet a few years afterward. By then, the house attracted over a thousand annual visitors; in 1996 alone, the guestbook collected 1,800 signatures from visitors from 21 countries and 35 US states. John retrospectively recalled that he continued to discover different design features while giving tours.

John stipulated that, upon his death, his daughter Linda (who later moved to Houston, Texas) would inherit Samara. John and Linda created the John E. Christian Family Memorial Trust in either 1991, 1992, or 1998. The trust, which was intended to maintain the house after John's death, applied for preservation grants. The house had 3,100 annual visitors by 2000, when the Christian family added floor lamps to the living room based on Wright's original plans. John estimated at the time that more than 30,000 people had visited during the house's entire existence, including 16,000 since 1992 alone. During that decade, tours were provided by reservation only, for a fee; youths could enter for free The house had 4,000 annual visitors by 2008, and the Tippecanoe Arts Federation gave the house $11,450 in 2011 to improve its exhibits. By then, the house retained most of its original decorations. John also commissioned a Wright-designed table runner from a local high school student who was a fan of Wright.

=== Museum use ===
John Christian died in July 2015, shortly after the house attained National Historic Landmark (NHL) status. At the time of his death, the Christian House was one of the oldest houses still under its original occupants. Afterward, Linda and volunteers continued to give tours of the house, which was taken over by preservation group Indiana Landmarks. Preservationists began planning a renovation of Samara in 2019. By then, large amounts of snow and rain had caused the house to deteriorate over the years; for example, the lanai doors could not be opened, and the ground beneath the terrace had eroded away. During the COVID-19 pandemic in 2020, the house hosted virtual tours.

In September 2020, Samara received $1 million in grants for repairs, including $500,000 from the National Park Service and $503,000 in matching funds from private donors. Harboe Architects was hired to oversee the project, which included structural repairs and reusing existing materials. Work included such details as the clerestory boards (which cost $20,800) and the glass doors and windows (which cost $125,800). The renovations were completed in 2023 for $2 million, and the house reopened that year. Nathan Allaire was hired as Samara's curator, and tours for the house were soon almost fully booked. For its careful preservation of original design details, the 2023 renovation received an award of excellence from the Modernism in America Awards hosted by preservation group Docomomo U.S. In September 2025, a rotted tree fell over, damaging the house.

== Impact and legacy ==
=== Reception ===
The writer Frank N. Owings Jr. said that "In many respects, the design for Samara was the true Usonian model." Purdue University historian David Parrish said in 1984 that the house had the "pronounced horizontality, the organic interplay of solid and void, and the refinement of detail" seen in Wright's other residential works. The Waterloo Courier wrote in 2004 that the house "is considered a perfect example of the architect's mature Usonian-style homes, designed specifically for the site and occupants". Two years later, the Associated Press described the house as "innovative, historic and a live-in work of art" and that the design "puts all the homes on MTV Cribs to shame".

In 2011, the Journal & Courier wrote that Samara was among West Lafayette's "architectural gems", and the local historian Wallace Rogers said that "here in the community, it is quite significant". The Indianapolis Star wrote in 2014 that the house posed "a most satisfying encounter with Frank Lloyd Wright's architecture". When the house became a National Historic Landmark the next year, The Indianapolis Star called it "a small, not that old but still spectacular house". The Chicago Tribune wrote that the house was noteworthy because it was "one of the most complete Frank Lloyd Wright homes in existence". In 2025, Indianapolis Magazine wrote that "Samara’s footprint is far from excessive with its comfortable 2,200 square feet of living space".

=== Landmark designations and media ===
The house was first added to the National Register of Historic Places (NRHP) in 1992. Samara was re-added to the NRHP when it was designated a National Historic Landmark in 2015; The designation commemorated the relatively intact condition of Wright's design features, including the modular interiors, open plan spaces, flat roofs, and terraces. At the time, the house was Indiana's 40th building to be designated as a NHL. Though Wright had designed 532 completed works (out of more than 1,100 he created during his lifetime), fewer than 30 Wright-designed buildings had attained NHL designation. Samara is one of three NHLs in Tippecanoe County, aside from Tippecanoe Battlefield and the Fort Ouiatenon site.

The Christians saved all the objects from the house and displayed some of them in museums. Items have been displayed at the John G. Blank Center for the Arts, the Art Museum of Greater Lafayette, and Purdue University. Planning drawings were displayed at the Salisbury House in Des Moines, Iowa, in 2010. Samara itself was the main subject of the 2004 traveling exhibit Frank Lloyd Wright's Samara: Realization of a Usonian Dream. The West Lafayette Public Library celebrated the house's 50th anniversary in 2006 with an exhibit of John Christian's Wright prints and artifacts from the house, and local elementary school students later built a scale model for that exhibit. Samara was also the subject of exhibits at the Architectural Foundation of Cincinnati, the Westcott House, the Midwest Museum of American Art, and the Portsmouth Art and Cultural Center.

The house was detailed in Rogers's 2001 book Winged Seeds of Indiana, the publication of which John Christian had commissioned. During his lifetime, John also collaborated with the local tourism bureau to promote the house. The Samara archives also include over 1,000 images of the house, along with drawings and correspondence related to its development.

== See also ==
- List of Frank Lloyd Wright works
- List of National Historic Landmarks in Indiana
- National Register of Historic Places listings in Tippecanoe County, Indiana
