= West Lafayette, Indiana =

- City
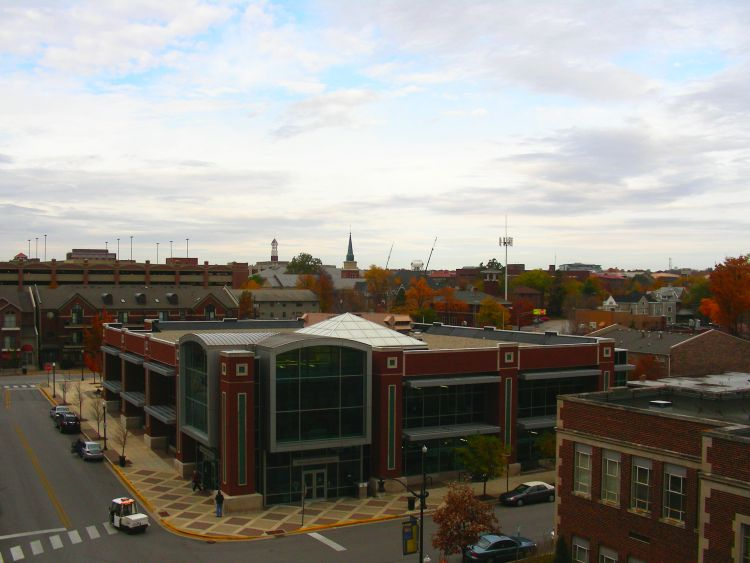
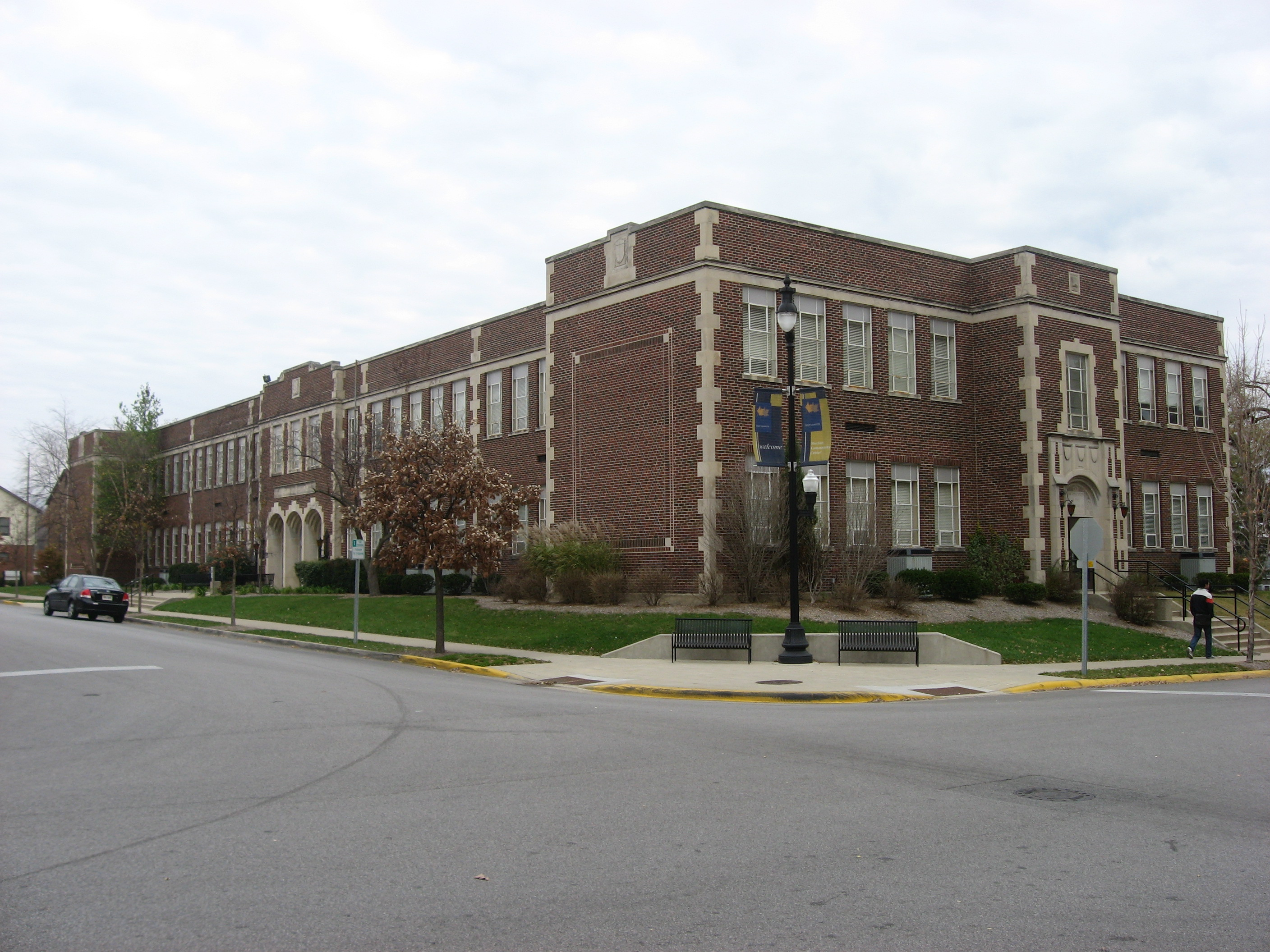
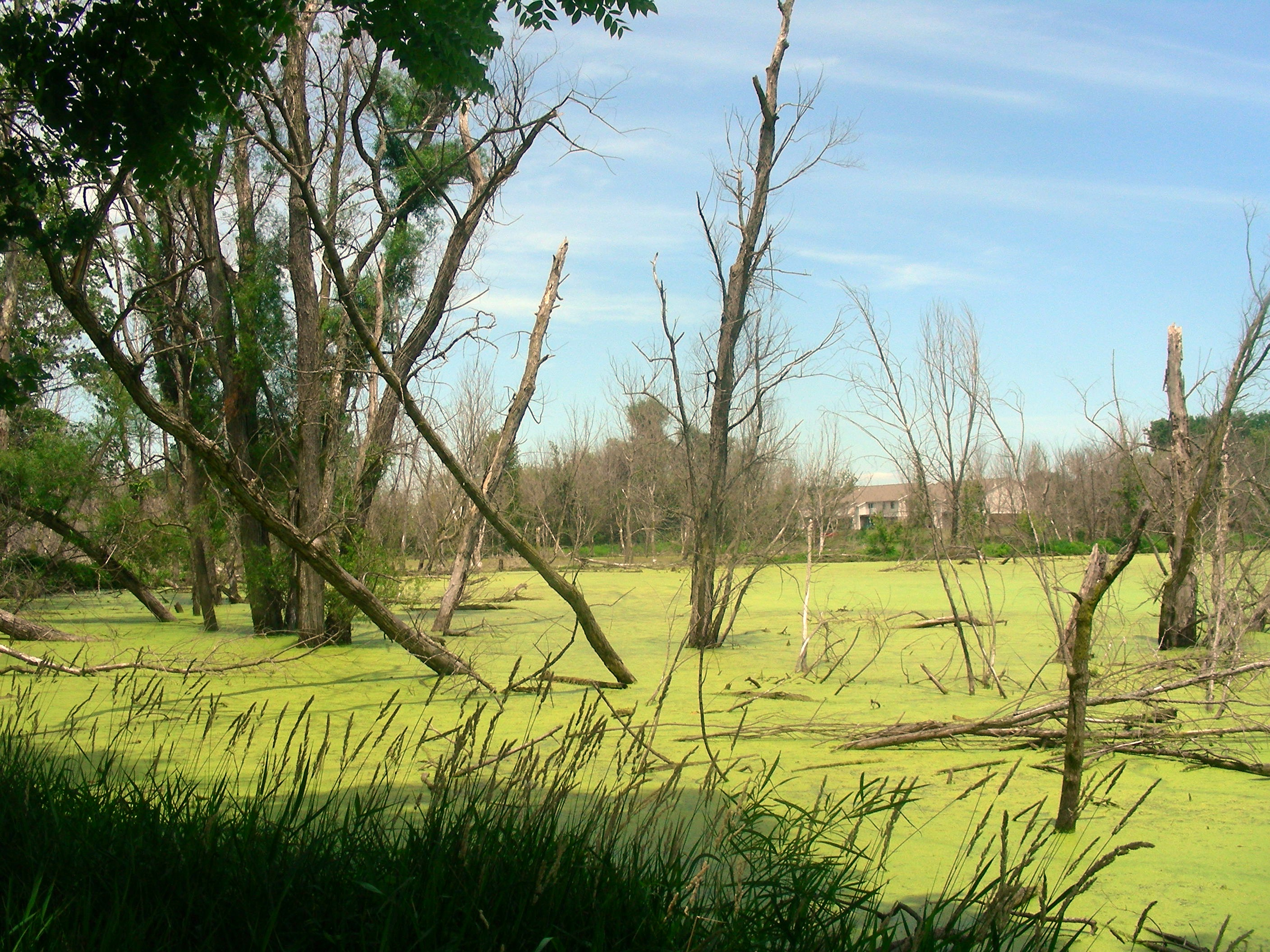
- West Lafayette Public Library and Purdue University in background West Lafayette City Hall, formerly Morton School Celery Bog nature area

- Flag
- Nickname: "West Side"
- Interactive map of West Lafayette, Indiana
- Location within Indiana Location within the United States
- Coordinates: 40°26′36″N 86°55′25″W
- Country: United States
- State: Indiana
- County: Tippecanoe
- Townships: Wabash, Tippecanoe
- Incorporated: 1888

Government
  - Mayor: Erin Easter (D)

Area
  - City: 13.82 sq mi (35.80 km^{2})
  - Land: 13.59 sq mi (35.20 km^{2})
  - Water: 0.23 sq mi (0.60 km^{2})
  - Metro: 904.6 sq mi (2,343 km^{2})
- Elevation: 705 ft (215 m)

Population (2020)
  - City: 44,595
  - Density: 3,281.3/sq mi (1,266.93/km^{2})
  - Metro: 182,821
- Time zone: UTC−5 (EST)
  - Summer (DST): UTC−4 (EDT)
- ZIP Code: 47906
- Area code: 765
- FIPS code: 18-82862
- GNIS feature ID: 2397268
- Website: www.westlafayette.in.gov

West Lafayette (/ˌlɑːfiˈɛt, ˌlæf-/ LA(H)F-ee-ET) is a city in Tippecanoe County, Indiana, United States. The population was 44,595 at the 2020 census. West Lafayette sits across the Wabash River from its sister city, Lafayette, and is a college town, home to Purdue University. It is the most densely populated city in Indiana, located 65 miles (105 km) northwest of Indianapolis and 113 miles (182 km) southeast of Chicago.

== History ==
Augustus Wylie laid out a town in 1836 in the Wabash River floodplain south of the present Levee. Due to regular flooding of the site, Wylie's town was never built. The present city was formed in 1888 by the merger of the adjacent suburban towns of Chauncey, Oakwood, and Kingston, located on a bluff across the Wabash River from Lafayette, Indiana. The three towns had been small suburban villages which were directly adjacent to one another. Kingston was laid out in 1855 by Jesse B. Lutz. Chauncey was platted in 1860 by the Chauncey family of Philadelphia, wealthy land speculators. Chauncey and Kingston formed a municipal government in 1866 which selected the name "Chauncey".

The new town of Chauncey remained a small suburban village until Purdue University opened in 1869. In 1871 Chauncey voted to be annexed by Lafayette because it was unable to provide the infrastructure (such as improved streets, waterworks, police and fire protection). Lafayette voted against annexing Chauncey because of the high cost of the many improvements that the village lacked. In May 1888, the town of Chauncey voted to change its name to West Lafayette after a petition signed by 152 electors. By that time, the growth of the university was fueling the growth of the little town. The address of Purdue University was given as "Lafayette, Indiana" until well into the twentieth century. West Lafayette never gained a railroad depot and lagged several years behind Lafayette in the establishment of municipal infrastructure and services. Today, West Lafayette has established itself as a separate city, with independent services and unique neighborhoods distinct from those of its sister city, Lafayette.

In November 2013, the City of West Lafayette approved an annexation that placed much of the Purdue University academic campus and residence hall system within the official boundaries of the municipality for the first time. This expansion also included a large section of the US Highway 231 corridor that was previously part of unincorporated Tippecanoe County.

Alpha Tau Omega Fraternity House, Jesse Andrew House, Chauncey-Stadium Avenues Historic District, John E. and Catherine E. Christian House, Curtis-Grace House, Happy Hollow Heights Historic District, Hills and Dales Historic District, Morton School, and The Varsity are listed on the National Register of Historic Places.

== Geography ==
West Lafayette lies in central Tippecanoe County and overlooks the Wabash River, which borders the city on the east and south. Most of the city lies in eastern Wabash Township, though a small portion on the northeast side extends into Tippecanoe Township. Elevations range from slightly over 500 feet (150 m) near the river to more than 720 feet (220 m) in northern parts of the city near U.S. Route 52.

According to the 2010 census, West Lafayette has a total area of 7.63 square miles (19.76 km^{2}), of which 7.62 square miles (19.74 km^{2}) (or 99.87%) is land and 0.01 square miles (0.03 km^{2}) (or 0.13%) is water.

== Climate ==
According to the Köppen Climate Classification system, West Lafayette has a hot-summer humid continental climate, abbreviated "Dfa" on climate maps. The hottest temperature recorded in West Lafayette was 111 °F (43.9 °C) on July 14, 1936, while the coldest temperature recorded was −24 °F (−31.1 °C) on January 20–21, 1985.

Climate data for West Lafayette, Indiana, 1991–2020 normals, extremes 1901–present
Month	Jan	Feb	Mar	Apr	May	Jun	Jul	Aug	Sep	Oct	Nov	Dec	Year
Record high °F (°C)	68 (20)	74 (23)	88 (31)	90 (32)	97 (36)	104 (40)	111 (44)	103 (39)	100 (38)	93 (34)	79 (26)	71 (22)	111 (44)
Mean maximum °F (°C)	56.9 (13.8)	60.4 (15.8)	72.5 (22.5)	81.2 (27.3)	89.1 (31.7)	93.1 (33.9)	92.5 (33.6)	91.7 (33.2)	90.7 (32.6)	83.9 (28.8)	70.5 (21.4)	59.3 (15.2)	94.8 (34.9)
Mean daily maximum °F (°C)	32.4 (0.2)	36.8 (2.7)	48.2 (9.0)	61.3 (16.3)	72.2 (22.3)	80.8 (27.1)	83.0 (28.3)	81.7 (27.6)	77.0 (25.0)	64.5 (18.1)	49.6 (9.8)	37.4 (3.0)	60.4 (15.8)
Daily mean °F (°C)	24.4 (−4.2)	28.1 (−2.2)	38.4 (3.6)	50.2 (10.1)	61.5 (16.4)	70.6 (21.4)	72.8 (22.7)	70.9 (21.6)	64.6 (18.1)	53.1 (11.7)	40.5 (4.7)	29.8 (−1.2)	50.4 (10.2)
Mean daily minimum °F (°C)	16.3 (−8.7)	19.5 (−6.9)	28.7 (−1.8)	39.2 (4.0)	50.9 (10.5)	60.3 (15.7)	62.5 (16.9)	60.1 (15.6)	52.2 (11.2)	41.4 (5.2)	31.5 (−0.3)	22.2 (−5.4)	40.4 (4.7)
Mean minimum °F (°C)	−6.5 (−21.4)	−1.4 (−18.6)	10.2 (−12.1)	23.1 (−4.9)	34.6 (1.4)	45.5 (7.5)	50.2 (10.1)	48.6 (9.2)	37.2 (2.9)	26.9 (−2.8)	16.1 (−8.8)	2.8 (−16.2)	−10.6 (−23.7)
Record low °F (°C)	−24 (−31)	−23 (−31)	−12 (−24)	7 (−14)	24 (−4)	35 (2)	42 (6)	35 (2)	25 (−4)	18 (−8)	−3 (−19)	−22 (−30)	−24 (−31)
Average precipitation inches (mm)	2.21 (56)	1.93 (49)	2.59 (66)	4.00 (102)	4.70 (119)	4.85 (123)	4.24 (108)	3.66 (93)	3.12 (79)	3.03 (77)	3.02 (77)	2.35 (60)	39.70 (1,008)
Average snowfall inches (cm)	5.9 (15)	5.2 (13)	2.3 (5.8)	0.4 (1.0)	0.0 (0.0)	0.0 (0.0)	0.0 (0.0)	0.0 (0.0)	0.0 (0.0)	0.0 (0.0)	0.9 (2.3)	4.2 (11)	18.9 (48.1)
Average precipitation days (≥ 0.01 in)	9.3	8.8	10.2	11.8	12.8	11.8	10.3	8.9	7.9	10.0	9.7	9.5	121.0
Average snowy days (≥ 0.1 in)	4.4	3.9	1.8	0.2	0.0	0.0	0.0	0.0	0.0	0.0	0.7	2.9	13.9
Source 1: NOAA
Source 2: National Weather Service

=== Neighborhoods ===
- Amberleigh Village
- Arbor Chase
- Avondale
- Bar Barry Heights
- Camelback
- Glenwood Heights
- Happy Hollow
- Hills and Dales
- New Chauncey Neighborhood
- Northwestern Heights
- Park Ridge
- Peppermill Village
- Plaza Park
- Prophets Ridge
- Stonebridge
- University Farm
- Wabash Shores

== Demographics ==
Historical population
Census	Pop.	Note	%±
1880	717		—
1890	1,242		73.2%
1900	2,302		85.3%
1910	3,867		68.0%
1920	3,830		−1.0%
1930	5,095		33.0%
1940	6,270		23.1%
1950	11,873		89.4%
1960	12,680		6.8%
1970	19,157		51.1%
1980	21,247		10.9%
1990	25,907		21.9%
2000	28,778		11.1%
2010	29,596		2.8%
2020	44,595		50.7%
U.S. Decennial Census

=== 2020 census ===
As of the 2020 census, West Lafayette had a population of 44,595. The median age was 21.7 years. 11.0% of residents were under the age of 18 and 7.3% of residents were 65 years of age or older. For every 100 females there were 117.0 males, and for every 100 females age 18 and over there were 118.7 males.

100.0% of residents lived in urban areas, while 0.0% lived in rural areas.

There were 14,281 households in West Lafayette, of which 18.8% had children under the age of 18 living in them. Of all households, 26.3% were married-couple households, 36.8% were households with a male householder and no spouse or partner present, and 33.1% were households with a female householder and no spouse or partner present. About 38.4% of all households were made up of individuals and 7.6% had someone living alone who was 65 years of age or older.

There were 16,109 housing units, of which 11.3% were vacant. The homeowner vacancy rate was 1.0% and the rental vacancy rate was 10.5%.

Racial composition as of the 2020 census
Race	Number	Percent
White	27,546	61.8%
Black or African American	1,741	3.9%
American Indian and Alaska Native	84	0.2%
Asian	8,540	19.2%
Native Hawaiian and Other Pacific Islander	19	0.0%
Some other race	1,489	3.3%
Two or more races	5,176	11.6%
Hispanic or Latino (of any race)	2,820	6.3%

=== 2010 census ===
As of the census of 2010, there were 29,796 people, 11,945 households, and 4,072 families living in the city. The population density was 3,884.0 inhabitants per square mile (1,499.6/km^{2}). There were 12,591 housing units at an average density of 1,652.4 per square mile (638.0/km^{2}). The racial makeup of the city was 60.2% White, 9.8% African American, 0.1% Native American, 17.3% Asian, 1.9% from other races, and 2.1% from two or more races. Hispanic or Latino of any race were 7.6% of the population.

There were 11,945 households, of which, 16.0% had children under the age of 18 living with them, 27.2% were married couples living together, 4.4% had a female householder with no husband present, 2.5% had a male householder with no wife present, and 65.9% were non-families. 34.2% of all households were made up of individuals, and 7.9% had someone living alone who was 65 years of age or older. The average household size was 2.22 and the average family size was 2.92.

The median age in the city was 22.8 years. 11.8% of residents were under the age of 18; 49.4% were between the ages of 18 and 24; 18.4% were from 25 to 44; 11.7% were from 45 to 64; and 8.7% were 65 years of age or older. The gender makeup of the city was 54.2% male and 45.8% female.

Following the 2010 census, West Lafayette annexed additional territory including the Purdue University main campus. The census bureau released an updated report to reflect the boundary updates. The census now reports 14,053 households and a population of 44,910.

=== 2000 census ===
As of the census of 2000, there were 28,778 people, 10,462 households, and 3,588 families living in the city. The population density was 5,219.6 inhabitants per square mile (2,015.3/km^{2}). There were 10,819 housing units at an average density of 1,962.3 per square mile (757.6/km^{2}). The racial makeup of the city was 69.3% White, 13.3% Asian, 8.4% African American, 0.2% Native American, <0.1% Pacific Islander, 1.2% from other races, and 1.6% from two or more races. Hispanic or Latino of any race were 9.2% of the population.

There were 10,462 households, out of which 14.9% had children under the age of 18 living with them, 27.6% were married couples living together, 4.4% had a female householder with no husband present, and 65.7% were non-families. 32.7% of all households were made up of individuals, and 7.3% had someone living alone who was 65 years of age or older. The average household size was 2.26 and the average family size was 2.89.

In the city, the population was spread out, with 10.4% under the age of 18, 54.6% from 18 to 24, 16.9% from 25 to 44, 10.3% from 45 to 64, and 7.7% who were 65 years of age or older. The median age was 22 years. For every 100 females, there were 133.5 males. For every 100 females age 18 and over, there were 137.2 males.

The median income for a household in the city was $24,869, and the median income for a family was $51,510.The per capita income for the city was $18,337. About 22.5% of families and 38.3% of the population were below the poverty line.

== Economy ==
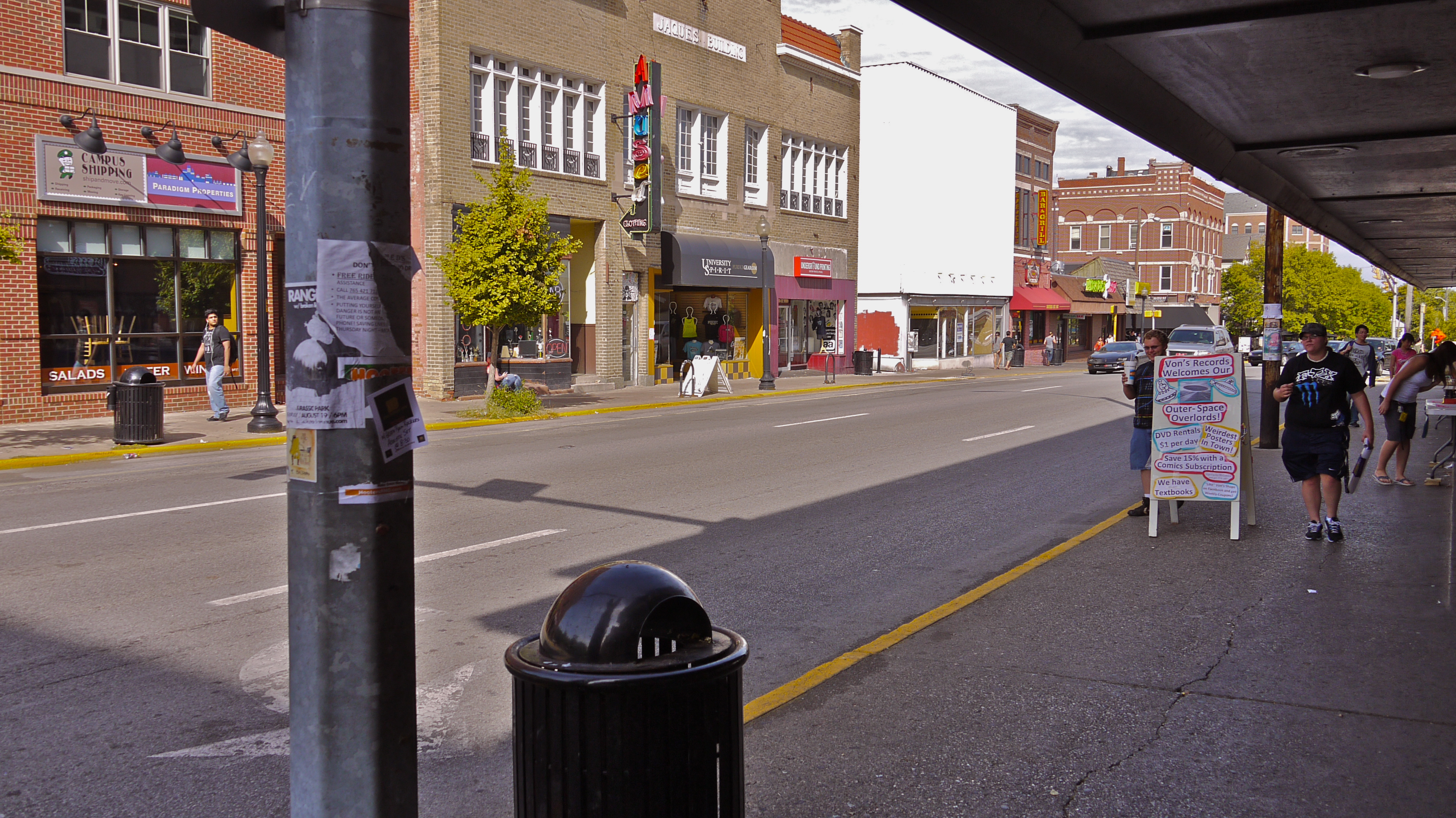
Chauncey Village before the State Street Project

The economy of West Lafayette is heavily influenced by the presence of Purdue University, with an enrollment of over 50,000, more than the city's population. The university employs 12,000 people, most of whom live in either West Lafayette or Lafayette.

The 725-acre (2.93 km^{2}) Purdue Research Park, established in 1961, is home to more than 140 companies of which nearly 100 are technology related. As of 2009, these companies employ more than 3,000. The Park offers communications infrastructure, research facilities, a business incubation complex to help start-up firms and scenic walking trails and lakes. It is one of the largest university-affiliated research parks in the United States. The Purdue Research Park is owned by Purdue Research Foundation, the university's non-profit funding and technology licensing arm.

Commercial activities, however, take place mostly across the river in Lafayette. The largest commercial area in West Lafayette is the 90-acre (360,000 m^{2}) Wabash Landing/Levee area, which has become a thriving urban-type district since the entire area was reconstructed and the Pedestrian Bridge to Lafayette replaced the old State Street bridge. The Levee features Wabash Landing, a complex containing shops, restaurants, coffee houses, a 9-screen movie theater, a hotel and the Riverside Skating Center.

== Arts and culture ==
The town has a lending library, the West Lafayette Public Library. There is also a branch of the county-run library (Tippecanoe County Public Library) in the Klondike area to the west of the city.

=== Points of interest ===
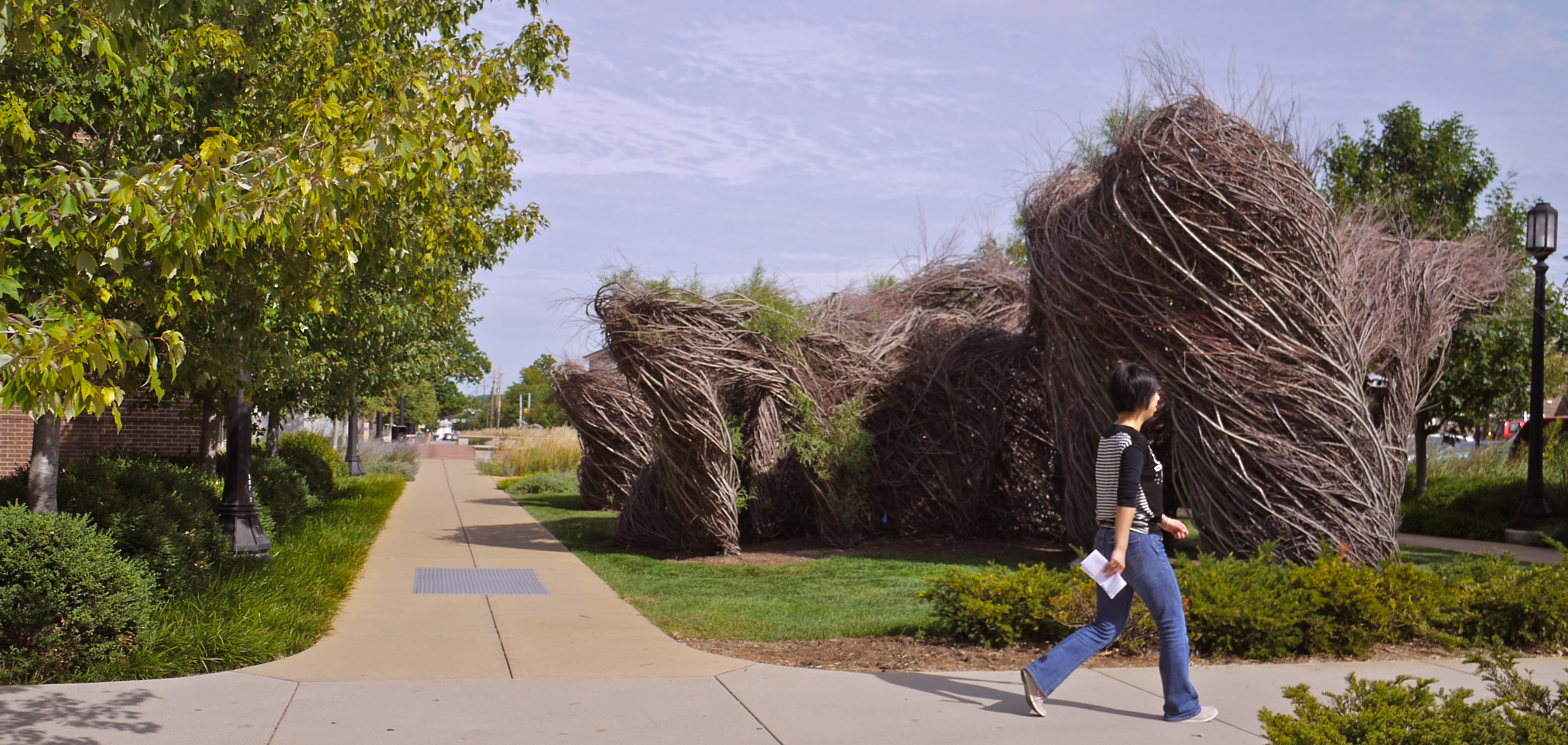
"Sidewinder" sculpture at Purdue's Pao Hall

- Purdue University
- Purdue University Horticulture Gardens
- Fort Ouiatenon, an early French trading post
- Purdue State Bank, 1914 bank building designed by architect Louis Sullivan
- Samara (John E. Christian House), a Usonian home designed by architect Frank Lloyd Wright
- Celery Bog Nature Area and Lilly Nature Center
- Purdue Horticulture Park

== Government ==
The city's elected officials consist of the mayor, a clerk, and a nine-member Common Council.

The nine-member Common Council holds the city's legislative authority and makes the laws through ordinances, orders, resolutions and motions. The city is divided into 6 districts, and the Common Council consists of one council member from each district, plus three at-large council members. Elected by the council members, the president of the Common Council presides over the council meetings and is first in the line of succession should the mayor not finish their term of office.

All city elected officials have a term of office of four years with no limit on the number of terms. Regular elections for all offices are held at the same time in the odd year preceding the presidential election year.

The following is a list of all mayors of West Lafayette since the position began in 1924.

Term	Name	Party
1924 – 1938	Myron B. Morgan	Republican
1939 – 1942	Dwight S. Keim	Republican
1943 – 1955	Charles R. Burnham	Republican
1956 – 1963	Fred L. Willis	Republican
1964 – 1971	James R. Williamson	Democratic
1972 – 1979	Joe S. Dienhart	Republican
1980 – 2003	Sonya L. Margerum	Democratic
2004 – 2007	Jan Mills	Democratic
2008 – 2024	John Dennis	Republican
2024 – Present	Erin Easter	Democratic

== Education ==
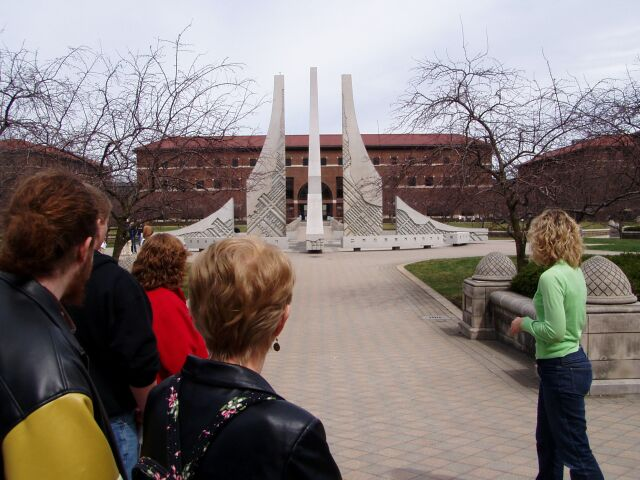
Class of 1939 Water Sculpture

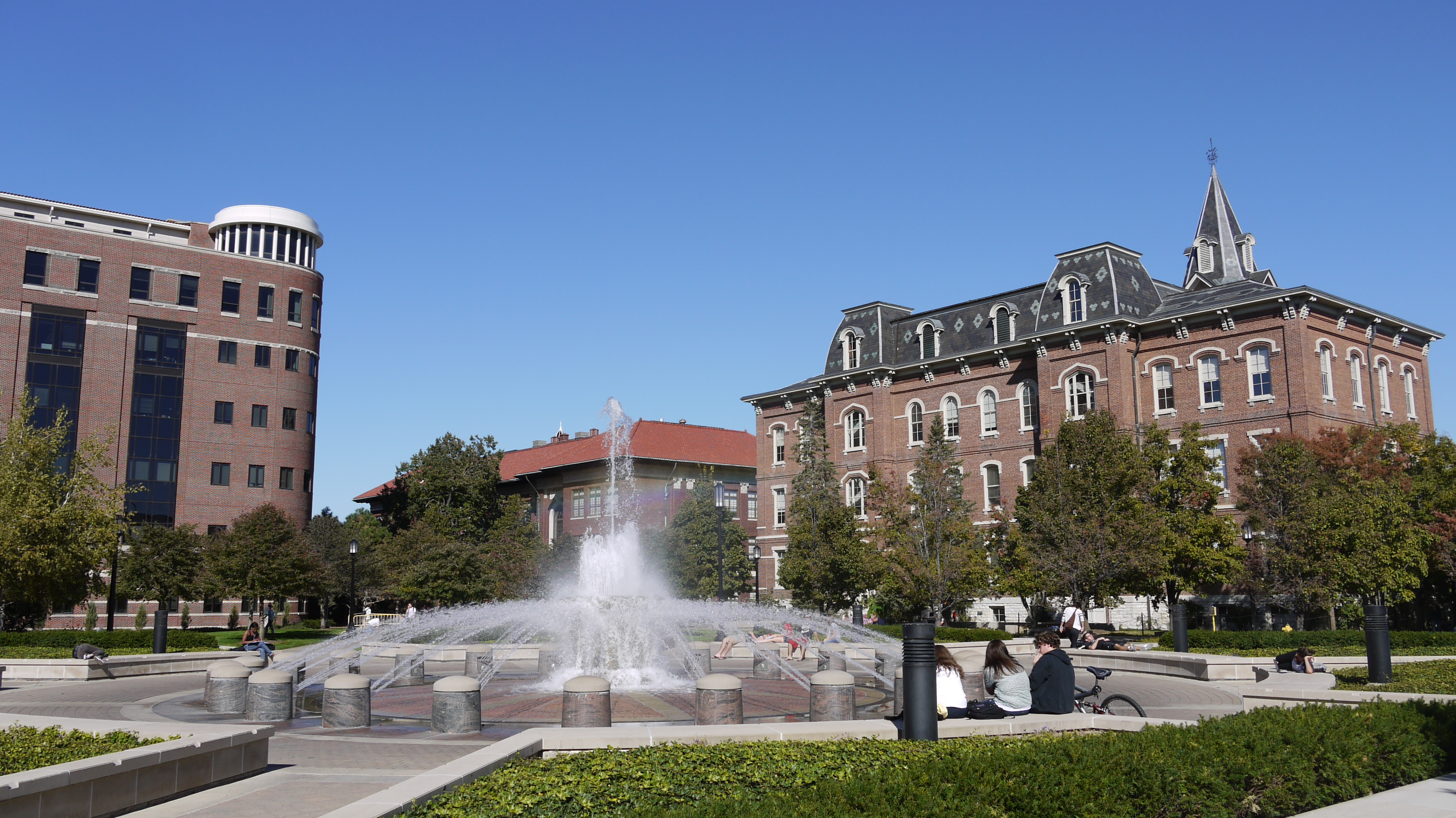
Loeb Fountain on Purdue's campus

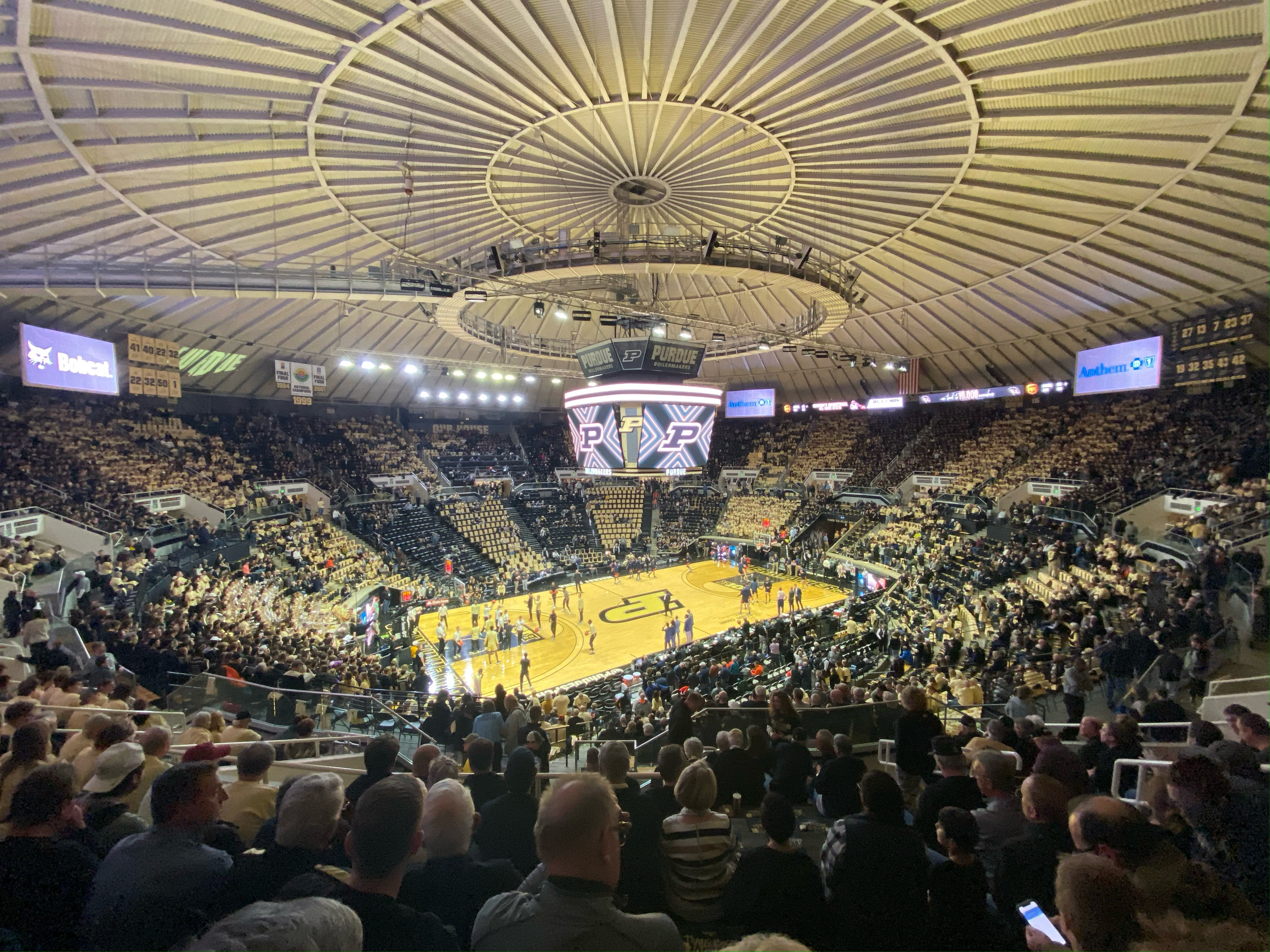
Mackey Arena

West Lafayette is the home of Purdue University's main campus, with an enrollment of over 40,000 students.

The West Lafayette Community School Corporation covers central portions of West Lafayette, administers three schools. The school district is not coterminous with the municipality; areas annexed by the city after 2000 continue to be served by county schools. Students attend West Lafayette Elementary School (formerly Cumberland Elementary School) through third grade, while students in grades 4–6 attend West Lafayette Intermediate School. Students in the 7th grade and above attend West Lafayette Junior-Senior High School. The Tippecanoe School Corporation covers outer-lying portions of the West Lafayette municipality. That district's schools are not in the West Lafayette municipal limits. The zoned high school of areas of West Lafayette in the Tippecanoe district is William Henry Harrison High School.

The Seventh-day Adventist Church operates Pleasantview SDA School which offers courses for grades K–8, and the Montessori School of Greater Lafayette teaches K–6. There are other schools, both public and private, that have a West Lafayette address, but these are actually located outside the city limits.

Approximately 77% of West Lafayette's population age 25 or older hold a bachelor's degree or higher according to the U.S. Census 2005–2007 American Community Survey. The city ranks sixth highest on this measure among U.S. municipalities between 20,000 and 65,000 population.

There is also a variety of private schools in Lafayette and an Ivy Tech Community College branch.

== Media ==
West Lafayette residents use many of the news and media outlets located in its twin city of Lafayette. Media located in West Lafayette proper include:

- The Purdue Exponent. Purdue University's independent student newspaper serving Purdue, West Lafayette, and Lafayette. Newsroom and offices located just off campus on Northwestern Avenue in West Lafayette.
- WPBI-LD 16 (Fox; NBC on LD2; ABC on LD3)
- WLFI-TV 18, (CBS; 18.2 CW; 18.3 Ion; 18.4 getTV; 18.5 Start TV)
- WPBY-LD 35 (ABC; MeTV/MyNetworkTV on LD2)
- WBAA Radio (WBAA 920 AM, and WBAA-FM 101.3 FM); National Public Radio affiliates with studios located on the Purdue University campus
- WLQQ Radio. (106.7FM)

== Infrastructure ==
=== Transportation ===
Public transportation in West Lafayette is managed by the Greater Lafayette Public Transportation Corporation.

==== Airport ====
- Purdue University Airport

==== Highways ====
- Interstate 65 to Gary, Indiana (near Chicago) and Indianapolis
- US 52 to Joliet, Illinois (also near Chicago) and Indianapolis
- US 231 to Rensselaer, Indiana and Owensboro, Kentucky
- State Road 26 from Purdue University campus to Kokomo, Indiana
- State Road 43 to Brookston, Indiana and Reynolds, Indiana

==== Railroads ====
- Amtrak (Lafayette station)
- CSX Transportation
- Kankakee, Beaverville and Southern Railroad
- Norfolk Southern Railway

== Notable people ==
For notable residents associated with Purdue University, see List of Purdue University people.
For notable natives from the neighboring city Lafayette, Indiana, see that page.

- Moungi Bawendi, Nobel Prize winner in chemistry
- Brian Binnie, test pilot for SpaceShipOne
- Joe Booher, racing driver
- Katie Bouman, computer scientist who was a member of the Event Horizon Telescope team that captured the first image of a black hole
- Max Mapes Ellis, American physiologist
- Bob Friend, Major League Baseball player
- Gen Fukunaga, founder of Funimation Entertainment
- Sanjay Ghemawat, computer scientist and senior fellow of Google
- Anissa Jones, actress, best known as "Buffy" on CBS's Family Affair
- Cleve Jones, conceived the AIDS quilt
- Stan Jones, educator and politician
- George Karlaftis, NFL player for the Kansas City Chiefs
- Tom Kelly, songwriter
- Harry G. Leslie, governor of Indiana
- Jay McDowell, bassist for country music band BR549
- Toby Moskowitz, financial economist
- Chike Okeafor, NFL player
- Eric Rodwell, multiple world champion bridge player
- Brian Rosenthal, journalist.
- Erik Sabel, MLB player
- Randy Truitt, former member of the Indiana House of Representatives
