= Jesse Andrew House =

Historic house in Indiana, United States

- U.S. National Register of Historic Places
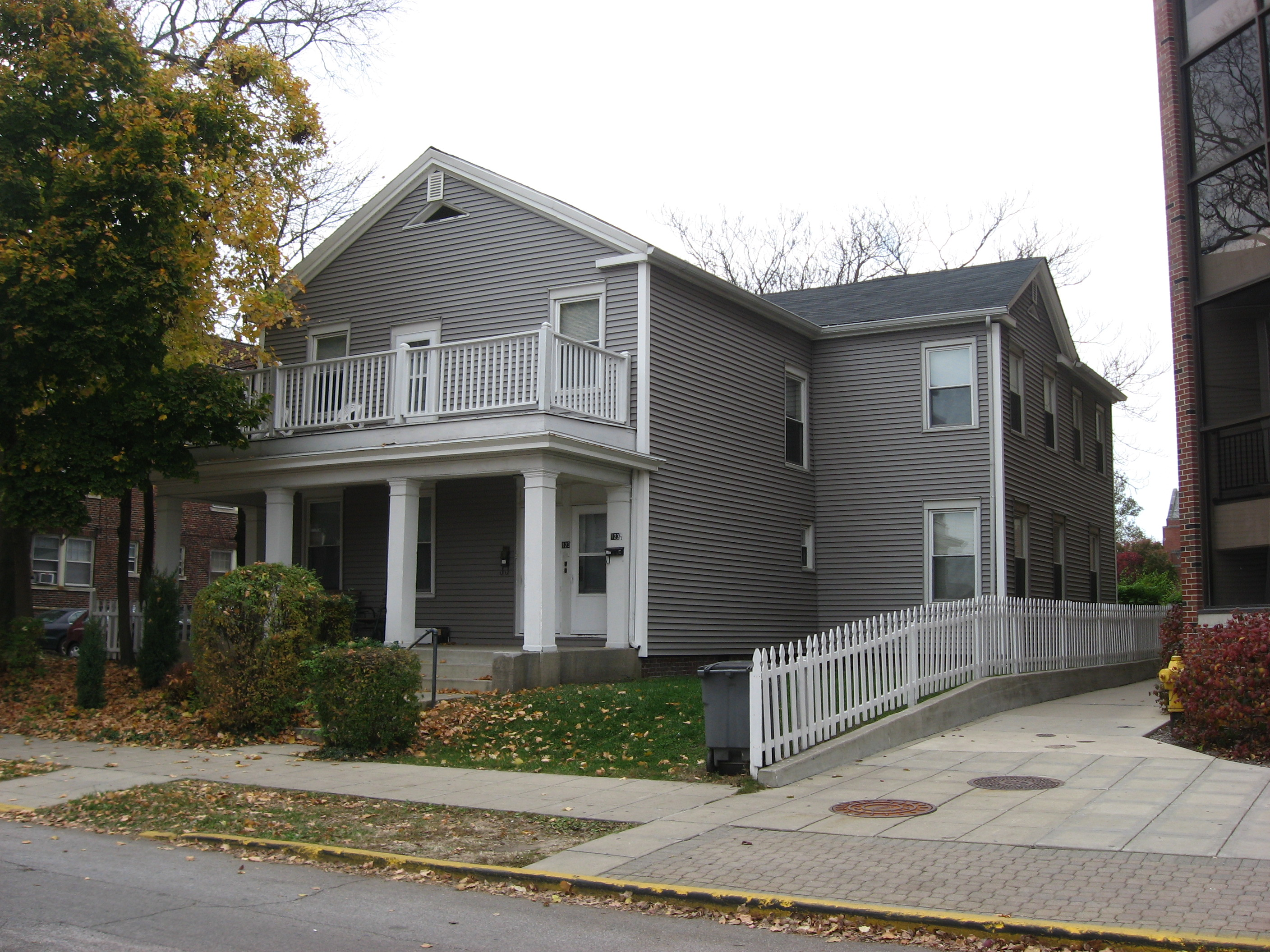
- View of front house from Andrew Place

- Location within Tippecanoe County, Indiana Location within Indiana Location within the United States
- Location: 123 Andrew Pl., West Lafayette, Indiana
- Coordinates: 40°25′28″N 86°54′34″W
- Area: less than one acre
- Built: 1859
- Architectural style: Greek Revival
- NRHP reference No.: 83000103
- Added to NRHP: August 11, 1983

The Jesse Andrew House is a historic building in West Lafayette, Indiana, placed on the National Register of Historic Places because of its historic value in the time of the founding of the city. It was the home of Jesse Andrew, a member of the early West Lafayette community and one of the city's founders as he took a major part in the establishment of the government. The house was originally built in 1859, making it the oldest home and one of the oldest structures in the city. It went through major renovations in the 1930s, turning it into a duplex, before being sold out of the Andrew family to a local rental company in the 1980s.

The house now serves as housing for Purdue students.

== Significance ==
"The Jesse Andrew House is significant as the oldest home extant in West Lafayette, and as the residence of one of the town's founders. A Greek Revival-style structure, built in 1859, this home remained in the Andrew family until 1982, and is one of few original structures remaining near the Purdue University campus. Jesse Andrew, Sr., the original owner of this house, was considered one of the most influential settlers in the area in the 1850s, One of 43 settlers who originally established the town government in 1866, Jesse Andrew also drew up the town's original plat. Both he and his son, Jesse Charles Andrew, who purchased this home in 1881, were prominent merchants in the community. As West Lafayette expanded, both men were responsible for platting important additions to the city. Subsequent owners of the home included Jesse Charles Andrew's brother, Thomas, and his son, Joseph, both of whom achieved local prominence. Thomas M. Andrew was the organizer and first president of the Purdue State Bank (now Purdue National Bank), and also served as a member of the Indiana State Legislature in 1904. His son, Joseph H. Andrew, who later owned and occupied this structure, was active in the American Red Cross, and served on that organization's National Board of Governors. The current owners purchased the structure from the Andrew family in 1982, and recently completed an extensive renovation."

== Appearance and structural details ==
"The Jesse Andrew Home is a two-story Greek Revival structure located on the south side of West Lafayette, near the Purdue University campus. The home is basically an ell-shaped structure with a gable roof; a small, hip-roofed wing, possibly a later addition, projects from the rear facade. Constructed as a single-family residence in 1859, this structure was altered to provide two apartment units sometime in the 1930s. The main (east) facade of the home is a gable end wall three bays in width. On the ground floor level, the two southernmost bays contain two-over-two, double-hung windows with entablature hood molds. The third bay has been modified from the original configuration and now contains two separate entry doors, to provide private access to each of the apartments. A large wooden porch dating from the 1880s protects the ground floor level of this facade; this porch features square columns with molded capitals supporting a flat roof with a wide frieze decorated with dentils and a cyma recta cornice. The porch roof also serves as a deck for the second floor, and features a balustrade with simple square balusters and corner posts. On the second floor, the two exterior bays contain double-hung windows similar to those on the ground floor. The middle bay, located slightly south of center, originally contained a window, but was converted into a doorway in the 1880s to provide access to the porch roof deck. A raking cornice and frieze with returns decorates the gable area, and a triangular attic vent is located just below the gable peak. Window and cornice detailing throughout the rest of the house is similar to that employed on the main facade. The interior of the house was slightly modified when the house was divided into apartments in the 1930s. The walnut balustrade of the main stairway was removed and the stair enclosed with a partition wall in order to provide privacy for the upstairs apartment; the balustrade has been discovered in storage in the attic. The endwall fireplaces were also sealed at this time and remain inoperable. Asbestos shingle siding was applied to the exterior of the home sometime in the 1950s. The present owners, who purchased the home from the Andrew family in 1982, have recently completed a major renovation of the structure. Several termite-damaged structural members were replaced, and other floor joists were braced with concrete block piers. The roof decking was repaired and a new roof installed. Repairs were also made at this time to the porch, windows, side door, exterior moldings, and various other elements of the home."
