= New Chauncey Neighborhood =

The New Chauncey Neighborhood it is a neighborhood in West Lafayette, Indiana at approximately 40°25′59″N 86°54′25″W (40.4330545, -86.9070765). It contains more than 600 homes and is home to two neighborhood parks: the Paula R. Woods Park (previously Centennial Neighborhood Park) and Lincoln Park. The New Chauncey Neighborhood takes its boundaries mostly from the original town of Chauncey or the Kingston and Chauncey villages which were founded in the 1860s. The neighborhood is bounded by River Road to the east, Kingston Drive and Meridian Street to the north, Northwestern Avenue to the west and Fowler Avenue to the south.

In December 2002, the New Chauncey Neighborhood was added to the National Register of Historic Places.
