= Morton School (West Lafayette, Indiana) =

- U.S. National Register of Historic Places
- U.S. Historic district
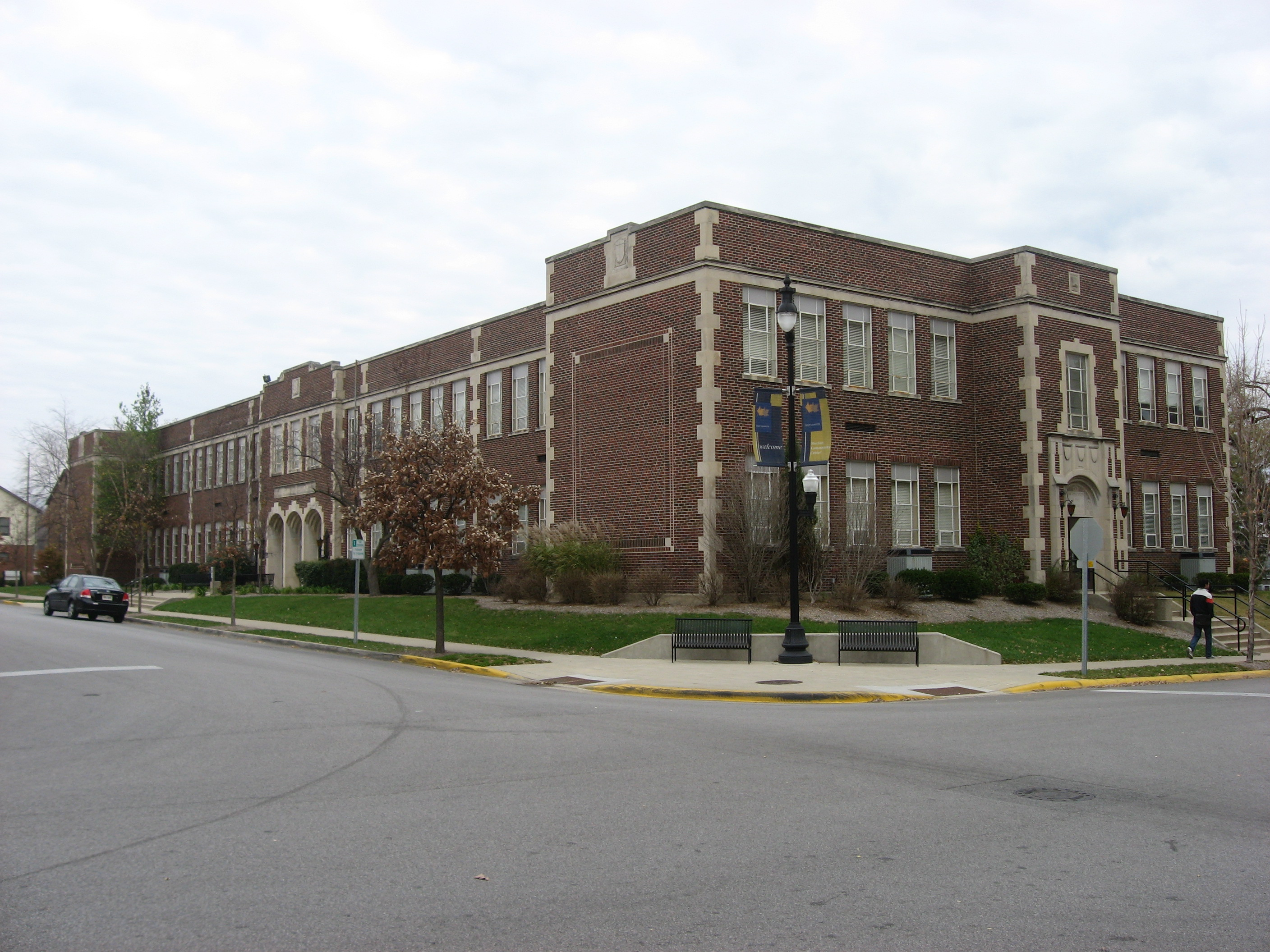
- Morton School, November 2009

- Location within Tippecanoe County, Indiana Location within Indiana Location within the United States
- Location: 222 N. Chauncey Ave., West Lafayette, Indiana
- Coordinates: 40°25′31″N 86°54′23″W
- Area: less than one acre
- Built: 1930
- Built by: Kemmer, A.E. Construction Co.
- Architect: Scholer, Walter Sr.
- Architectural style: Tudor Revival
- MPS: Indiana's Public Common and High Schools MPS
- NRHP reference No.: 99001113
- Added to NRHP: September 9, 1999

Morton School is a historic school building located at West Lafayette, Indiana. It was built in 1930, and is a two-story, E-shaped, Tudor Revival style brick and limestone building. It has a flat roof and features a triple-arched main entrance and stepped parapet. It housed a school into the mid-1980s, after which it has been used as a community centre.

It was listed on the National Register of Historic Places in 1999.

Since 2021, the Morton School building has served as West Lafayette's seat of government, as the Sonya L. Margerum City Hall, named after a former mayor of the city.
