= University Farm (Indiana) =

University Farm is a residential neighborhood in the city of West Lafayette, Indiana, named for its proximity to Purdue University. Begun in 1981, University Farm now contains approximately 565 households. It is located at 40°27'N 86°54'W and has an average elevation of approximately 700 feet.

Streets and courts in University Farm are named for Indiana counties: Benton, Boone, Clay, Crawford, Decatur, Elkhart, Floyd, Gibson, Hamilton, Jasper, Jennings, Lagrange, Laporte, Morgan, Newton, Noble, Pike, Putnam, Ripley, Shelby, Spencer, St. Joseph, Steuben, Sullivan, Warrick and Whitley.
