= Delia Silance =

First African-American woman to graduate from Purdue University

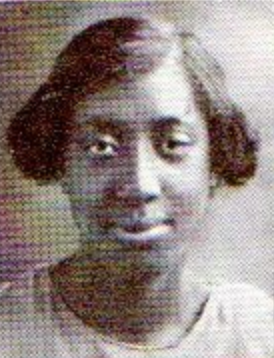
- Delia Silance, from a 1925 yearbook
- Born: March 20, 1907; Lafayette, Indiana, U.S.
- Died: April 10, 1984 (age 77); Lafayette, Indiana, U.S.
- Occupation(s): Educator, clubwoman

Delia Loretta Silance (March 20, 1907 – April 10, 1984) was an American educator. She and her younger sister Ella Belle were the first known African-American women to graduate from Purdue University, in 1932. Silance worked in high schools and higher education until she retired in 1970.

== Early life and education ==
Silance was born in Lafayette, Indiana, the daughter of Louis Napoleon Silance and Emma Florence Smith Silance. She graduated from Jefferson High School in 1925, and earned a bachelor's degree from Purdue University in 1932, with help from a scholarship from the Indiana Association of Colored Women's Clubs, and an academic scholarship. Both of her parents died while she was in college, and Purdue policies meant that she could not live in the college dormitories or use campus dining halls. She and her sister Ella Belle lived with their grandmother Delia Smith and other relatives until they both finished college in 1932. She received a special award for being an "outstanding girl in science", and she was on the distinguished student list all eight semesters of her college career. The Silance sisters are considered the first known African-American women to graduate from Purdue. Their brothers Louis and Clyde also graduated from Purdue.

Delia Silance completed a master's degree in education at Purdue in 1933. Both Silance sisters were inducted into the Sigma Xi honor society in 1934.

== Career ==
Silance worked in federal programs during the Great Depression, teaching English, Spanish, and history in Indiana. In the 1940s she taught at high schools in Prairie View, Texas, and in Clarksville, Tennessee. From the late 1950s until she retired in 1970, she worked at Purdue University, in the Division of Educational Reference.

Silance was active in Church Women United, the NAACP, and local women's clubs. She was president of the Missionary Society at Bethel AME Church, and a leader of the Mary L. Club, a women's club that raised scholarship money for Black students. In 1940, she and her sister attended an Indianapolis concert by child prodigy Philippa Schuyler.

== Personal life ==
Silance lived with her sister Ella most of their lives. Delia Silance died in 1984, in Lafayette, at the age of 77. Ella Silance died four years later, also at the age of 77.
