= Tippecanoe Mall =

- Location: 2415 Sagamore Pkwy South, Lafayette, Indiana 47905
- Coordinates: 40.392504°N 86.850817°W
- Address: 2415 S. Sagamore Parkway
- Opened: August 8, 1973
- Developer: Melvin Simon & Associates
- Owner: Simon Property Group
- Num. of stores: 96
- Num. of anchor tenants: 7
- Floor area: 831,563 square feet (77,255 square meters)
- Floors: 1
- Public transit: CityBus

Tippecanoe Mall is an enclosed shopping mall in Lafayette, Indiana. Opened in 1973, it is anchored by JCPenney, Macy's, Kohl's, Malibu Jack's, and Dick's Sporting Goods. It is owned by Simon Property Group.

== History ==
Melvin Simon & Associates opened Tippecanoe Mall on August 8, 1973. It was originally slated for a 1973 opening with Montgomery Ward and Detroit-based Federal's as its anchors, although the other anchor instead became JCPenney. William H. Block Co. was added as a third anchor.

Montgomery Ward closed its store at the mall in April 1983. The same year, high winds damaged the Block store, so Block temporarily moved its merchandise to the former Montgomery Ward while its store was repaired. By 1985, Kohl's had replaced the Montgomery Ward. Block's became Lazarus in 1987. An expansion announced in 1994 added a new wing anchored by Sears and L. S. Ayres, the latter of which relocated from Market Square Mall.

The first Hat World opened at Tippecanoe Mall in 1995. Lazarus closed its store and two others in 2002. In 2004, the Lazarus building was razed for Dick's Sporting Goods and hhgregg. L. S. Ayres became Macy's in 2006. H&M opened in 2012, replacing a former MC Sports. hhgregg closed in 2017 as a result of Chapter 11 bankruptcy.

On May 31, 2018, it was announced that Sears would be closing as part of a plan to close 72 stores nationwide. The store closed on September 2, 2018.

== See also ==
- List of shopping malls in the United States
- List of Simon Property Group properties
