= WJEF =

Radio station in Lafayette, Indiana

Coordinates: 40.398°N 86.874°W

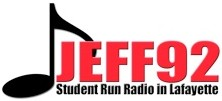
- Lafayette, Indiana; United States
- Broadcast area: Lafayette, Indiana
- Frequency: 91.9 MHz
- Branding: Jeff 92

Programming
- Format: 50s-80s Oldies

Ownership
- Owner: Lafayette School Corp

History
- First air date: January 7, 1972
- Call sign meaning: We're JEFferson High School

Technical information
- Licensing authority: FCC
- Facility ID: 36228
- Class: A
- ERP: 250 watts
- HAAT: 28 meters (92 ft)

Links
- Public license information: Public file; LMS
- Webcast: Listen Live
- Website: WJEFradio.com

WJEF is a non-commercial radio station licensed to the Lafayette School Corporation in Lafayette, Indiana. It is located at 91.9 MHz on the FM dial. WJEF broadcasts in stereo with an effective radiated power of 250 watts. The station's studio and offices are located at Jefferson High School's William S. Fraser Radio/TV Center in Lafayette, Indiana with a tower facility behind the school off South 18th Street. The station also webcasts the off-air signal 24/7.

== Programming ==
Jeff 92 features an eclectic mix of oldies from the 50s, 60s, 70s, and 80s. During the school day, WJEF features student DJs as well as news reports. In addition, WJEF carries Jefferson High School's Boys' basketball games, and all home and away football games. The station is automated when school is not in session.

== History ==
On January 7, 1972, the station signed on with a regular broadcasting schedule using the callsign WJJE. The station was the creation of Jefferson High School's teacher Bill Fraser. WJJE's original format was a middle of the road (MOR) format. In the spring of 1985 the format was changed to Adult Contemporary. By the end of 1985 the regular use of albums as a music delivery system ended. In the fall of 1987, the station changed its slogan identifier to "Easy Rock 91-9" in attempt to update the image. The Adult Contemporary format remained until the fall of 1991 when the station switched to an oldies format and changed its slogan identifier again, this time to JEFF 92.

In October 1996 a 1000 watt stereo transmitter was installed replacing the original 25-year-old model. It wasn't until almost 2 years later that the control room was completely rewired and a new audio board, speakers, and furniture were installed to prepare for the new millennium. In May 1999 the station sign-on time changed from 7:15 AM to 7:00 AM and the station remained on the air each weekday during the school year until 4 PM. In May 2000 automation equipment arrived and the process of recording music onto the automation computer's hard drive began. In September of the same year, JEFF 92 began an expanded broadcast schedule, staying on the air each school weekday until 11 PM.

On January 8, 2001, JEFF 92 began broadcasting 24 hours a day, 7 days a week. The following school year, in addition to all home football and boys' basketball games, JEFF 92 began carrying all away games as well. In September 2002, the Radio-TV center was officially renamed The William S. Fraser Radio-TV Center in a ceremony honoring founder and educator, Bill Fraser.

In June 2003, a new ON-AIR automation computer replaced the older unit that had been in service for almost 3 years allowing for more music in the rotation. Almost a year later, in May 2004, WJEF founder William Fraser died. In September 2004 all Jefferson High School sporting events carried by the station became available on the Internet, both as live broadcasts and in archive form. However, this only lasted during the 2004–2005 school year. In December 2004 after 32 years of service, the station's FM antenna atop the 100 foot tower behind the school was replaced.

In April 2005, WJEF began webcasting 24/7 from a senior project by student Vince PeGan. In May of that year the first $500 William S. Fraser Scholarship Award was given to senior Vince PeGan. After nearly a year of work by WJEF staffers, the station moved to an entirely digital music collection.
