= Jefferson High School (Indiana) =

Lafayette Jefferson High School

Location
- 1801 South 18th Street; Lafayette, Indiana 47905; United States
- 40°23′53″N 86°52′29″W

Information
- Type: Public high school
- Established: 1912
- School district: Lafayette School Corporation
- Principal: Mark Preston
- Faculty: 145.50 (FTE)
- Grades: 9-12
- Enrollment: 2,113 (2024-2025)
- Student to teacher ratio: 13.98
- Color
- Athletics conference: North Central Conference
- Team name: Bronchos
- Newspaper: The Booster
- Yearbook: The Nautilus
- Website: jhs.lsc.k12.in.us

Jefferson High School (often referred to as "Lafayette Jefferson" or "Lafayette Jeff" or "Jeff") is a high school located in Lafayette, Indiana, United States and administered by the Lafayette School Corporation. Its mascot is the Broncho and its school colors are red and black.

== History ==
In a meeting held February 10, 1910, Lafayette's school board decided to proceed with construction of a new school to replace the aging and inadequate Lafayette High School at Sixth and Columbia. The new school, a three-story brick building to be named Jefferson High School, was erected in the block between Ninth, Tenth, Elizabeth and Cincinnati Streets. Jefferson opened its doors to students in January 1912 and was formally dedicated April 2. The old high school building at Sixth and Columbia became a vocational school, with classes beginning July 1, 1913.

By the early 1960s, Lafayette's growing population prompted the board to consider either expanding the current school building or constructing a new facility. In 1965 they settled on the latter, and in 1966 a 43-acre (170,000 m^{2}) section of land around the Pythian Home on South 18th Street was purchased to accommodate the project. The new Jefferson High School was dedicated May 24, 1970. The old Jeff building on North Ninth Street served from 1970 to 1982 as Tippecanoe Junior High School (Chargers) and was later occupied by Ivy Tech Community College; most recently it has been converted to apartments for the elderly. The building also served as the annex to local charter elementary school, New Community School, from 2009 to 2013.

== Arts ==
Construction on the Rohrman Center for the Performing Arts completed in 2008 and includes additional practice and performance rooms for the school's orchestra, bands, and choirs. They have three orchestras; Allegro, Maestoso, and Cantabile. With Cantabile being the highest orchestra. Choirs include the First Edition mixed show choir, the Expressions girls show choir, the top ranked concert choir Varsity Singers, A Cappella, the all inclusive mixed show choir, CSN, which stands for Chorale Sine Nomine (or the choir with no name) is the all-male choir, Accents is the all-female beginners choir, and there are also various after school singing groups that perform at various events. Lafayette Jefferson Marching Band competes around the state during the regular season and travels across the continent for special performances, including the 1988 Winter Olympics in Calgary, Alberta.

== Publications ==
The yearbook (The Nautilus) and the newspaper (The Booster) have both won numerous awards for their achievements in the journalistic world. The school also jointly operates with Purdue University the ESports@Jeff program to provide videos, statistics and other content wirelessly during athletic events, and operates STRIVE, a community service organization that helps Make a Wish Foundation, Habitat for Humanity and other charitable groups. Among Jefferson High School's programs are JEFF 92 (WJEF), a student-operated radio station broadcasting since 1972.

== Athletics ==
Scheumann Stadium, a multipurpose football/track/soccer facility, opened in 2004. The school is a part of the North Central Conference with Harrison and McCutcheon which are also located in the Lafayette/West Lafayette area.

Sports offered at Jeff include:

- Baseball (boys)
  - State champs - 1969, 1973
- Basketball (boys & girls)
  - Boys state champs - 1916,1948, 1964
- Bowling (boys & girls)
- Cross country (boys & girls)
- Football (boys)

Sectional champs 2022,2024

- Golf (boys & girls)
  - Boys state champs - 1932, 1977, 1978, 1987
  - Girls state champs - 1979, 1983, 1984
- Gymnastics (girls)
- Soccer (boys & girls)
- Softball (girls)
- Swimming (boys & girls)
  - Girls state champs - 1975
- Tennis (boys & girls)
  - Boys state champs - 1975
- Track & field (boys & girls)
- Volleyball (girls)
- Wrestling (boys)

Baseball is played at Loeb Stadium.

== Notable alumni ==
- William Afflis, football player, Green Bay Packers, and professional wrestler known as Dick the Bruiser
- Ron Alting, a member of the Indiana State Senate representing the 22nd district, serving Tippecanoe County; graduate of Purdue University
- Brooks Barnhizer, NBA player
- Ray Ewry, 8-time Olympic Gold Medalist in Track and Field (1900, 1904, 1908)
- Dustin Keller, football player, currently retired, played with the Miami Dolphins, formerly with the New York Jets
- Adam Kennedy, actor and author, old football field was named after his dad, Jack Kennedy
- Brian Lamb, founder of C-SPAN, 1959 grad
- Chukie Nwokorie, football player, Indianapolis Colts and Green Bay Packers
- Benjaman Kyle, (class of 1967), amnesia victim
- Axl Rose, co-founder and singer for Guns N' Roses
- Delia Silance and Ella Silance, educators, first Black women to graduate from Purdue University
- George Souders, racing driver and winner of the 1927 Indianapolis 500
- Izzy Stradlin, co-founder and rhythm guitarist for Guns N' Roses
- Kelly Meacham, fashion designer and founder of the brand Slay Swimwear. Kelly is from the graduating class of 2006.

== See also ==
- List of high schools in Indiana
