= A Taste of Tippecanoe =

Festival in Lafayette, Indiana, United States

Coordinates: 40°25′08.9″N 86°53′35.0″W

A Taste of Tippecanoe logo

Taste of Tippecanoe is a one-day summer festival held in downtown Lafayette, Indiana on the third Saturday in June. The festival, which generally draws around 40,000 people, focuses on providing visitors a wide selection of foods from community restaurants, plus live musical entertainment. It is operated by The Arts Federation (formerly Tippecanoe Arts Federation) and is the organization's primary fundraiser. It was founded by Lafayette citizen Steve Klink.
