= James H. Ward House =

Historic house in Indiana, United States

- U.S. National Register of Historic Places
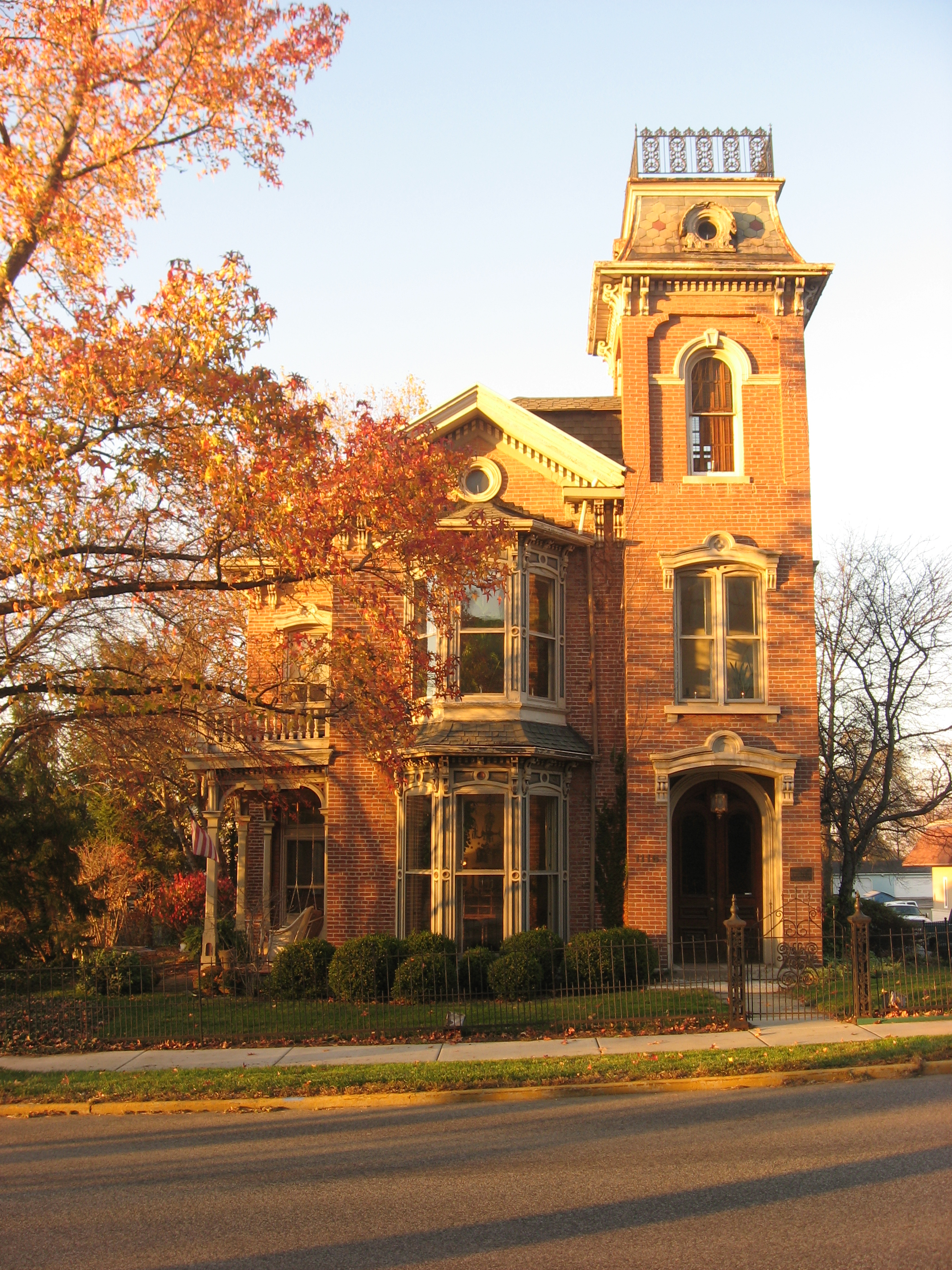
- James H. Ward House, November 2009

- Location within Tippecanoe County, Indiana Location within Indiana Location within the United States
- Location: 1116 Columbia St., Lafayette, Indiana
- Coordinates: 40°25′6″N 86°53′2″W
- Area: 0.2 acres (0.081 ha)
- Built: c. 1875
- Architectural style: Second Empire, Italianate
- NRHP reference No.: 88000385
- Added to NRHP: April 7, 1988

James H. Ward House is a historic home located at Lafayette, Indiana, United States. It was built about 1875, and is a two-story Italianate / Second Empire style brick dwelling, with a 3 1/2-story mansard roofed tower. It features deep overhanging eaves with corner brackets, asymmetrical massing, and an ornate semi-hexagonal, two-story projecting bay. Also on the property is a contributing carriage house.

It was listed on the National Register of Historic Places in 1988.
