= Lafayette School Corporation =

School district in Indiana

Location
- Tippecanoe County, Indiana Indiana United States

District information
- Type: Public
- Motto: Nurture | Inspire | Empower
- Grades: K-12
- President: Brent Clemenz
- Vice-president: Dave Moulton
- Superintendent: Les Huddle
- Schools: 12
- NCES District ID: 1805400

Students and staff
- Students: 7,616
- Teachers: 550

Other information
- Website: www.lsc.k12.in.us

The Lafayette School Corporation administers three high schools, one intermediate school, one junior high school and eight elementary schools in Lafayette, Indiana. Its administrative offices are at 2300 Cason Street in Lafayette, Indiana.

It covers much of, though not all of, Lafayette.

== History of the Lafayette School Corporation ==
Originally known as the School City of Lafayette, the district became the Lafayette School Corporation on January 1, 1963. Its superintendents have included:

- A. J. Vawter, 1855–1863
- J. W. Molière, 1863–1867
- Jacob Merrill, 1867–1890
- Edward Ayres, 1890–1902
- Russell Bedgood, 1902–1904
- Robert F. Hight, 1904–1921
- D. W. Horton, 1921–1923
- A. E. Highley, 1923–1932
- Morris E. McCarty, 1932–1947
- Aaron T. Lindley, 1947–1952
- Dr. J. Russell Hiatt, 1952–1977
- Dr. Edward Eiler, 1996–2012
- Mr. Les Huddle, 2012-

Lafayette's school system has built a reputation for extracurricular programs, especially its band, choral, and visual arts programs. The Marching Bronchos, currently under the direction of Tyler Long, have qualified for ISSMA State Marching Band Finals seven times since 1983 and have performed in Hollywood, Philadelphia, Orlando and Hawaii. The wind ensemble has consistently qualified for ISSMA State Concert Band Finals since 2001. The concert choir, Varsity Singers, under the direction of Michael Bennett, has consistently qualified for ISSMA State Concert Choir Finals since 1994, receiving second-place honors three times and placing first in 2018. The show choir The First Edition is nationally known, including performances in Miami, Orlando, Philadelphia, Nashville, Washington D.C., Chicago, Boston, Los Angeles, New York City, Europe, Mexico and the Bahamas, and has been recognized on four occasions since 1990 by the Indiana General Assembly for outstanding achievements in musical performance and community contributions. Students in the visual arts program consistently take top honors at state and national level competitions.

=== Board of School Trustees ===
Current members of the elected non-partisan Board of School Trustees of the Lafayette School Corporation include:

Title	Office Holder	District
President	Julie Peretin	AL
Vice President	Steve Bultinck	D
Secretary	Ebony Barrett	AL
Board Member	Robert Stwalley	II
Board Member	Brent Clemenz	III
Board Member	Oscar Trujillo	D
Board Member	Margaret Hass	AL

All regular meetings of the Board of School Trustees of the Lafayette School Corporation are held at the Hiatt Administration Center located at 2300 Cason St. in Lafayette, Indiana, on the second Monday of each month at 7 p.m.

== Schools ==
=== High schools ===
- Jefferson High School
- Greater Lafayette Career Academy
- Oakland Academy

=== Middle schools ===
- Lafayette Sunnyside Intermediate School
- Lafayette Tecumseh Junior High School

=== Elementary schools ===
- Earhart Elementary School
- Edgelea Elementary School
- Glen Acres Elementary School
- Miami Elementary School
- Miller Elementary School
- Murdock Elementary School
- Oakland Elementary School
- Vinton Elementary School

== 2006-2010 school years ==
In 2006, Lafayette Tecumseh Junior High School (formerly Tecumseh Middle School) was renamed and assigned to serve all seventh- and eighth-grade students in the LSC.

In 2010, Lafayette Sunnyside Intermediate School (formerly Sunnyside Middle School) was renamed and assigned to serve all fifth- and sixth-grade students in the LSC.
