= Greater Lafayette Public Transportation Corporation =

Municipal corporation founded in 1971

Greater Lafayette Public Transportation Corporation (CityBus)

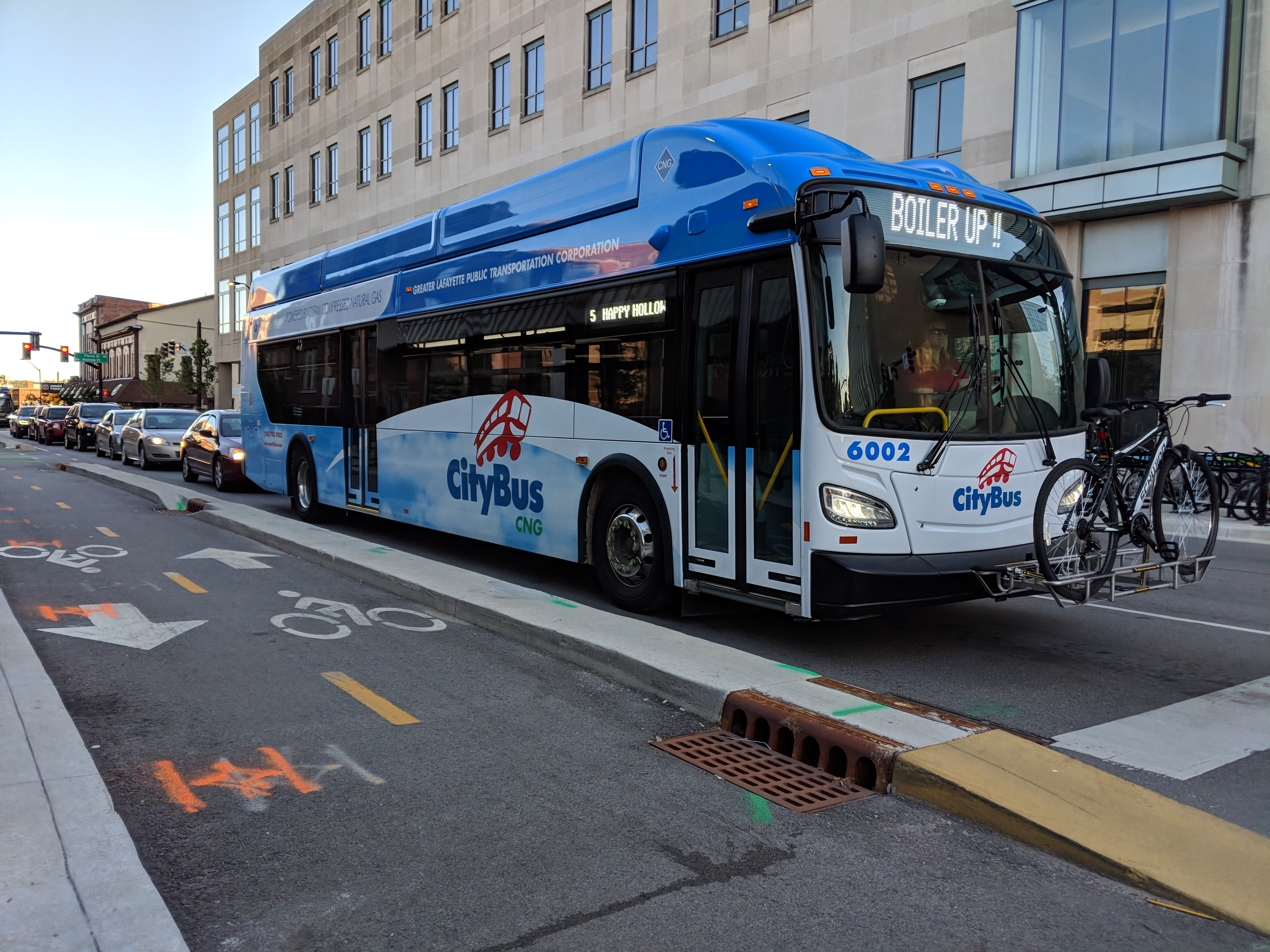
- CityBus bus in West Lafayette
- Founded: 1971
- Headquarters: 1250 Canal Rd
- Locale: Lafayette, Indiana
- Service area: Lafayette, West Lafayette & Purdue University
- Service type: Local bus and paratransit
- Routes: 19
- Stops: 668
- Hubs: CityBus Center in Lafayette
- Fleet: 72 vehicles
- Daily ridership: 8,800 (weekdays, Q2 2026)
- Annual ridership: 3,258,300 (2025)
- Fuel type: Diesel, CNG
- Chief executive: Bryan Smith, Chief Executive Officer
- Website: gocitybus.com

The Greater Lafayette Public Transportation Corporation (GLPTC) is a municipal corporation founded in 1971 that provides bus services in Tippecanoe County, Indiana under the operating name of CityBus. In 2025, the system had a ridership of 3,258,300, or about 8,800 per weekday as of the second quarter of 2026.

== History ==
In 1970, the privately owned Greater Lafayette Bus Company abruptly ceased operations and the City of Lafayette hastily assumed operation of the bus routes. Since the routes operated in West Lafayette in addition to Lafayette, a funding mechanism that allowed the use of tax revenues from both cities was needed. GLPTC was formed to operate city bus services in the two cities and select surrounding areas of Tippecanoe County. GLPTC receives funding from the federal government, the State of Indiana and property taxes levied in the service areas. In 1998 GLPTC began using the operating name CityBus.

== Current operations ==
As with most transit agencies, CityBus saw a decrease in ridership in 2020 due to the COVID-19 pandemic. A small increase was observed in 2021 and again in 2022. The corporation's revenue for 2022 was $15.09 million, with approximately $3.3 million coming from farebox collections, pass sales, charters and other services. As of October 2024, the CityBus fleet consists of 72 buses: 7 paratransit buses, 44 CNG buses, 20 hybrid diesel-electric buses, and 1 diesel bus. In 2021 CityBus (GLPTC) was the second busiest bus system in Indiana, with more than 2.4 million rider trips.

CityBus maintains a partnership with Ivy Tech Community College that allows students, faculty and staff of the university to ride free of cost.

CityBus is currently undergoing fleet modernization that will eventually replace all of their Diesel and Hybrid buses with CNG buses. As of August 2020, CityBus surpassed their goal of having 50% of their fleet use CNG fuel by 2025.

In June 2023, CityBus was awarded a grant from the FTA's Low or No Emission Grant Program to purchase four hydrogen fueled buses and begin to develop necessary infrastructure to fuel and support these buses.

On April 4, 2025, CityBus announced they would no longer be providing campus transportation for Purdue University. All campus routes were discontinued at the end of the 2024–2025 school year.

On July 1, 2025, CityBus announced the first major overhaul of its route network titled "Reimagine CityBus". The goal was to "provide a more useful, intuitive, and efficient transit experience...". CityBus intends to improve route coverage and frequency. With this, Sunday service was discontinued.

On August 24, 2026, further changes to its route network were implemented including the deletion of 35 Park East Boulevard and 36 South 18th Street. There were additional schedule and routing alignments made to routes 11, 12, 13, 14, 32, 34, 21, and 41. These changes were made to conserve funds as the transit agency faces a budget shortfall. Further changes will be implemented in May 2027.

== Routes ==
CityBus operates 15 regular routes through Lafayette and West Lafayette and 3 contracted routes for apartment complexes.

CityBus Routes
Lafayette		West Lafayette		Express Routes
Core Routes	Local Routes	Core Routes	Local Routes	51E Lark and Alight Express
11 Creasy Lane	31 North 9th Street	21 McCormick Road	41 The Connector	52E Cumberland Express
12 South Street	32A Schuyler Ave	22 Salisbury West	42 Happy Hollow Road	53E Lindberg Express
13 Main Street	32B Union Street	23 Sagamore West	43 Northwestern Avenue	
14 Brady Lane	33 Ferry Street			
	34 Teal Road			

== CityBus Center ==
The CityBus Center, located at 316 North Third Street, serves as the primary transfer hub in the system. The $2.2 million facility features dedicated space for each bus route and an indoor waiting area along with a customer service desk, restrooms, and a rain garden. The station opened on August 19, 2013.

== Current fleet ==
CityBus operates a fleet of transit and para-transit buses. A slight majority of its transit buses are New Flyers, but there are also a number of Gillig Low Floor / Gillig BRT buses. The para-transit buses, used for their "ACCESS" system, are mostly mini-buses based on the Ford E-Series chassis. In 2015, CityBus, along with other transportation providers, signed a 5-year contract with New Flyer to provide up to 159 new buses (total) for the providers. CityBus ordered buses 5001–5009, 6001–6006, and 7001–7006 through the consortium, for a total of 21 buses, fulfilling their portion of the contract.

CityBus Fleet
Number	Manufacturer	Model Year	Engine/Fuel Type	Transmission	Model	Wrap	Notes	Pictures	Video
0913–0916	New Flyer	2009	Cummins ISL Diesel-Electric Hybrid	Allison E^{P}50 hybrid system	DE60LFR	New "Standard" CityBus (no wrap)	Ex-Champaign-Urbana #0913-#0916.	0913; None; None; None	None; None; None; None
1701–1702	New Flyer	2010	Cummins ISL9 Diesel-Electric Hybrid	Allison E^{P}50 hybrid system	DE60LFR	New "Standard" CityBus (no wrap)		1701; 1702	None; 1702
1703–1707	Gillig	2009	Cummins ISL Diesel-Electric Hybrid	Allison E^{P}40 hybrid system	40' Low Floor BRT	Standard CityBus Hybrid: 1706 none.	1703 was retired on November 16, 2023.	1703; 1704; 1705; 1706; 1707	1703; 1704; 1705; 1706; 1707
1801–1804	Gillig	2010	Cummins ISL9 Diesel-Electric Hybrid	Allison E^{P}40 hybrid system	40' Low Floor BRT	Standard CityBus Hybrid		1801; 1802; 1803; 1804	1801; 1802; 1803; 1804
1901–1903	New Flyer	2011	Cummins ISL9 Diesel-Electric Hybrid	Allison H 50 EP hybrid system	DE60LFR	1901 Close to Campus, Village West, Station 21; 1902 Sunflower CityBus Hybrid; 1903 Kite CityBus Hybrid		1901; 1902; 1903	1901; 1902; 1903
1904–1905	Gillig	2011	Cummins ISL9 Diesel-Electric Hybrid	Allison H 40 EP hybrid system	40' Low Floor BRT	Standard CityBus Hybrid		1904; 1905	None; 1905
2401	New Flyer	2024	Cummins L9N 280	Allison B400R	XN40	New "Standard" CityBus (no wrap)	Put into service on 8/19/24.	None	None
2402	New Flyer	2024	Cummins L9N 280	Allison B400R	XN40	New "Standard" CityBus (no wrap)	Put into service on 8/19/24.	None	None
2403	New Flyer	2024	Cummins L9N 280	Allison B400R	XN40	New "Standard" CityBus (no wrap)	Put into service on 8/19/24.	None	None
3114, 3214	Gillig	2014	Cummins ISL9 Diesel-Electric Hybrid	Allison H 40 EP hybrid system	35' Low Floor BRT	Standard CityBus Hybrid	Previously numbered 401–402.	Here: Here	Here: Here
3314	Gillig	2014	Cummins ISL9	Allison B400R	35' Low Floor	Standard CityBus	Previously numbered 403.	Here	Here
4001	Gillig	2015	Cummins Westport ISL-G 280	Allison B400R	40' Low Floor BRT	Evergreen Campus Rental (2022 Wrap)		Here	Here
4002	Gillig	2015	Cummins Westport ISL-G 280	Allison B400R	40' Low Floor BRT	Standard CityBus CNG		Here	None
4003	Gillig	2015	Cummins Westport ISL-G 280	Allison B400R	40' Low Floor BRT	New "Standard" CityBus (no wrap)		Here	Here
4004	Gillig	2015	Cummins Westport ISL-G 280	Allison B400R	40' Low Floor BRT	None.		Here	None
4005	Gillig	2015	Cummins Westport ISL-G 280	Allison B400R	40' Low Floor BRT	Morris Rentals		Here	Here
4006	Gillig	2015	Cummins Westport ISL-G 280	Allison B400R	40' Low Floor BRT	New "Standard" CityBus (no wrap)		Here	Here
4007	Gillig	2015	Cummins Westport ISL-G 280	Allison B400R	40' Low Floor BRT	New Standard CityBus (None)		Here	None
4008	Gillig	2015	Cummins Westport ISL-G 280	Allison B400R	40' Low Floor BRT	Hensley Legal Group		Here	None
4009	Gillig	2015	Cummins Westport ISL-G 280	Allison B400R	40' Low Floor BRT	The Fountain Trust Company (2019 Wrap)		Here	Here
4010	Gillig	2015	Cummins Westport ISL-G 280	Allison B400R	40' Low Floor BRT	Standard CityBus CNG (Budget Edition)	Standard Blue CNG top, all white with red stripe, and blue numbers.	Here	Here
4011	Gillig	2015	Cummins Westport ISL-G 280	Allison B400R	40' Low Floor BRT	Hensley Legal Group		Here	Here
4012	Gillig	2015	Cummins Westport ISL-G 280	Allison B400R	40' Low Floor BRT	Budget CityBus		Here	Here
5001	New Flyer	2016	Cummins Westport ISL-G 280	Allison B400R	XN40	Standard CityBus CNG		None	Here
5002	New Flyer	2016	Cummins Westport ISL-G 280	Allison B400R	XN40	Purdue Federal Credit Union		Here	Here
5003	New Flyer	2016	Cummins Westport ISL-G 280	Allison B400R	XN40	The Cottages on Lindberg (2019 Wrap)		Here	None
5004	New Flyer	2016	Cummins Westport ISL-G 280	Allison B400R	XN40	Valley Oaks Health (2025 Wrap)		Here	Here
5005	New Flyer	2016	Cummins Westport ISL-G 280	Allison B400R	XN40	Standard CityBus CNG		Here	Here
5006	New Flyer	2016	Cummins Westport ISL-G 280	Allison B400R	XN40	Standard CityBus CNG		Here	Here
5007	New Flyer	2016	Cummins Westport ISL-G 280	Allison B400R	XN40	Standard CityBus CNG		Here	Here
5008	New Flyer	2016	Cummins Westport ISL-G 280	Allison B400R	XN40	Standard CityBus CNG		Here	Here
5009	New Flyer	2016	Cummins Westport ISL G 280	Allison B400R	XN40	State Bank		Here	Here
6001	New Flyer	2019	Cummins Westport L9N 280	Allison B400R	XN40	Standard CityBus CNG		Here	Here
6002	New Flyer	2019	Cummins Westport L9N 280	Allison B400R	XN40	Standard CityBus CNG		Here	Here
6003	New Flyer	2019	Cummins Westport L9N 280	Allison B400R	XN40	Standard CityBus CNG		Here	Here
6004	New Flyer	2019	Cummins Westport L9N 280	Allison B400R	XN40	Standard CityBus CNG		Here	Here
6005	New Flyer	2019	Cummins Westport L9N 280	Allison B400R	XN40	Standard CityBus CNG		Here	Here
6006	New Flyer	2019	Cummins Westport L9N 280	Allison B400R	XN40	Standard CityBus CNG		Here	None
6007	New Flyer	2019	Cummins Westport L9N 320	Allison B500R	XN60	CityBus Space Theme		Here	Here
7001	New Flyer	2019	Cummins Westport L9N 280	Allison B400R	XN40	Standard CityBus CNG		Here	None
7002	New Flyer	2019	Cummins Westport L9N 280	Allison B400R	XN40	None		Here	None
7003	New Flyer	2019	Cummins Westport L9N 280	Allison B400R	XN40	New "Standard" CityBus (no wrap)	Put into service on 10/30/20	Here	Here
7004	New Flyer	2019	Cummins Westport L9N 280	Allison B400R	XN40	None	Put into service on 10/01/20	Here	Here
7005	New Flyer	2019	Cummins Westport L9N 280	Allison B400R	XN40	None.	Blue CityBus logo and blue numbers. Put into service on 11/13/20	Here	None
7006	New Flyer	2019	Cummins Westport L9N 280	Allison B400R	XN40	Standard CityBus CNG	Put into service on 9/30/20	Here	None
8001	New Flyer	2021	Cummins Westport L9N 320	Allison B500R	XN60	None	Put into service on 02/15/22.	None	Here
8002	New Flyer	2021	Cummins Westport L9N 320	Allison B500R	XN60	Standard CityBus CNG	Put into service on 03/07/22	None	Here
8003	New Flyer	2021	Cummins Westport L9N 280	Allison B400R	XN40	Purdue Think Summer (2022 Wrap)	Put into service on 06/23/22	None	None
8004	New Flyer	2021	Cummins Westport L9N 280	Allison B400R	XN40	Greater Lafayette Community Wrap	Put into service on 12/6/21. First used in parade on 12/4/21.	None	None
8005	New Flyer	2021	Cummins Westport L9N 280	Allison B400R	XN40	Standard CityBus CNG	Put into service on 03/11/22.	None	None
8006	New Flyer	2021	Cummins Westport L9N 280	Allison B400R	XN40	Standard CityBus CNG	Put into service on 12/2/21.	None	None
8007	New Flyer	2021	Cummins Westport L9N 280	Allison B400R	XN40	Standard CityBus CNG	Put into service on 12/13/21.	None	Here

== Retired fleet ==
These buses have been retired from the CityBus fleet. Retired vehicles are typically auctioned off to the public, while some are used for spare parts prior to sale.

CityBus Retired Fleet
Number	Manufacturer	Model Year	Engine/Fuel Type	Model	Wrap	Notes	Pictures	Videos
T101–T102	Chance	2002	Cummins ISB	AH-28	"The Trolley" CityBus	Retired in 2014, sold in 2015	None	None
102–107	GMC	1957	Detroit Diesel 6-71	TDH-4512	Unknown	Ex-Fort Wayne Public Transportation Corporation	None	None
108–112	GMC	1956	Detroit Diesel 6-71	TDH-4512	Unknown	Ex-Fort Wayne Public Transportation Corporation	None	None
201–216	Highway Products	1973	Unknown	TC-25	Unknown		None	None
218–222	Flxible	1975	Detroit Diesel 6V71N	35096-6-1	Standard GLPTC		None	None
301–305	Flxible	1978	Detroit Diesel 6V71N	45096-6-0	Unknown		None	None
306–309	Gillig	1983	Detroit Diesel 6V92TA	40' Phantom	Standard CityBus	306, 307, 308, and 309 – Ex-SamTrans 804, 812, 813, and 820, respectively. Retired by 2008.	None	308
362–63, 365–67, 369–70	New Flyer	1995	Detroit Diesel Series 50	D35LF	Standard CityBus	Ex-Ann Arbor Transportation Authority of the same respective number. Retired by 2012.	370	None
401–410	GMC	1981	Detroit Diesel 6V71N	T6H-4523N	Standard GLPTC	Retired by 1998. 410 was used in special events, such as parades, up until Dec 2017.	410	None
501–502	Flxible	1985	Detroit Diesel 6V71TA	Metro "A"	Standard CityBus		None	None
503–507	Flxible	1986	Detroit Diesel 6V71TA	Metro "A"	Standard CityBus		None	None
508–517	Flxible	1985	Detroit Diesel 6V92TA	Metro "A"	Standard CityBus	508, 509, 510, and 511 – Ex-Muncie Indiana Transit System 17, 18, 19, and 20, respectively.	None	None
601–605	Flxible	1987	Detroit Diesel 6V71TA	Metro "B"	Standard CityBus		None	602
606–609	Orion Bus Industries	1987	Detroit Diesel 6V71N	Orion I	Unknown	606, 607, 608, and 609 – Ex-LexTran 62, 63, 68, and Unknown, respectively.	None	None
701–704	Flxible	1990	Cummins L10	Metro "B"	Standard CityBus		None	703
705–708	New Flyer	1990	Detroit Diesel 6V92TA	D60	Standard CityBus	705, 706, 707, and 708 – Ex-SamTrans 503, 502, 506, and 520, respectively. Retired by 2011.	None	705
709–714	New Flyer	1994	Detroit Diesel Series 50	D60	Standard CityBus	709, 710, 711, 712, 713, and 714 – Ex Minneapolis/St. Paul Metro 2136, 2145, 2134, 2137, 2146, and 2129, respectively.; Retired by end of 2011.; 711 was never put into service and used as a parts bus.; 714 was the last of the series in service and was retired and sold in 2015.	None	714
715–717	New Flyer	1998	Detroit Diesel Series 50	D60	Standard CityBus	715, 716, and 717 – Ex-Minneapolis/St. Paul Metro 3034, 3039, and 3051 respectively.; Retired by end of 2017.; The transmission from 717 was put into 720.	700s; 715	715; 716; 717
718–720	New Flyer	1998	Detroit Diesel Series 50	D60LF	Standard CityBus	718 – Ex-Minneapolis/St. Paul Metro Transit #3059; seats from articulation area were removed. MY 1998 bus completed in March 1999. Retired on November 17, 2020. Listed for Auction in November 2021.; 719 – Ex-Minneapolis/St. Paul Metro Transit #3062; seats from articulation area were removed. MY 1998 bus completed in March 1999. Retired on October 1, 2021. Listed for auction in June 2022.; 720 – Ex-Minneapolis/St. Paul Metro Transit #3061; seats from articulation area were removed. MY 1998 bus completed in March 1999. Retired on April 16, 2021. Listed for Auction in November 2021.	718; 719; 720	718; 719; 720
721–723	New Flyer	2003	Cummins ISL	D60LF	Standard CityBus	Ex-London Transit #601. Retired on October 17, 2023.; Ex-London Transit #602. Retired on March 24, 2022. Being used as a parts bus.; Ex-London Transit #603. Retired on February 28, 2022. Being used as a parts bus.	721; 722; 723	721; None; 723
724–727	New Flyer	2003	Detroit Diesel Series 50 EGR	D60LF	Standard CityBus	All retired early due to WLHS route discontinuation.; 724 Ex-Community Transit #23807. Retired on May 6, 2022. Listed for auction in August 2022.; 725 Ex-Community Transit #23823. Retired on May 6, 2022. Listed for auction in August 2022.; 726 Ex-Community Transit #23819. Retired on August 24, 2021. Listed for auction in June 2022.; 727 Ex-Community Transit #23809. Retired on February 19, 2021. Listed for auction in June 2022.	None; 725; None; None	724; None; None; None
801–806	Gillig	1992	Cummins L10	30' Phantom	Standard CityBus		None	805
901–906	Gillig	1994	Cummins L10	35' Phantom	Standard CityBus		None	901
907	Gillig	1994	Detroit Diesel Series 50	40' Phantom	Unknown	Ex-Minneapolis/St. Paul Metro Transit 2318	None	None
908	Gillig	1995	Detroit Diesel Series 50	40' Phantom	Unknown	Ex-Minneapolis/St. Paul Metro Transit 333	None	None
1001–1009	Gillig	1998	Cummins ISC 280	35' Low Floor	Standard CityBus	1001 Had a two-note stop request bell.; Most were retired in 2014 and 2015.; 1008 was the last of the series in service and retired in 2016.	1000s	1001
1101–1103	Gillig	1999	Cummins ISC 280	40' Low Floor	Various	1101 Retired in 2015; 1102 Retired in 2016; 1103 Retired in 2014, became a parts bus.	None	None
1104–1112	Gillig	1998	Detroit Diesel Series 50	40' Phantom	Standard CityBus	1104, 1105, 1106, and 1107 – Ex-Minneapolis St. Paul Metro Transit 411, 427, 430, and 433 respectively. Retired by 2014.; 1108, 1109, 1110, 1111, and 1112 – Ex-Minneapolis St. Paul 441, 447, 464, 467, and 480 respectively. Retired by 2014.; 1112 was the last of the series in service and retired by 2016.	1112	1112
1201–1206	Gillig	2002	Cummins ISM	40' Low Floor	1201-2 Jimmy John's; 1203 Skydive Indy; 1204 CityBus Training Bus; 1205 Standard CityBus; 1206 The Avenue Apartments	Majority retired by the end of 2017.; 1202 was retired in September 2017. Listed for auction in March 2018.; 1204 was retired in 2018. Assumed donated to Ivy Tech.; 1206 was retired on October 22, 2018.; 1205 was retired in May 2019. Listed for Auction in November 2021.	1200s	1201; 1202; 1203; 1205; 1206
1301–1303	Gillig	2003	Cummins ISM	40' Low Floor	1301 The Avenue Apartments; 1302 Standard CityBus; 1303 The Connector (CityBus)	1301 was retired in October 2019. Sold to Star Dust Tours.; 1302 was retired in October 2020. Being used as a parts bus.; 1303 was retired on February 7, 2018.	1301; 1302; 1303	1301; 1302; 1303
1401–1404	Gillig	2005	Cummins ISL	40' Low Floor	1401 & 1404 Standard CityBus; 1402 & 1403 Subway Catering (2017 Wrap)	1401 was retired on October 22, 2021. Being used as a parts bus.; 1402 was retired on November 14, 2019. Listed for Auction in November 2021.; 1403 was retired in October 2019. Sold to Star Dust Tours.; 1404 was retired on November 8, 2021. Being used as a parts bus.	1401; 1402; 1403; 1404	1401; 1402; 1404
1405–1406	Gillig	2005	Cummins ISB Diesel-Electric Hybrid	40' Low Floor	Yosemite Free Shuttle	1405 was purchased from Yosemite Concessions, previously bus 20519, to be used as a parts bus. It never entered revenue service, but was internally renumbered 1405.; 1406 was purchased from Yosemite Concessions, previously bus 20521, to be used as a parts bus. It never entered revenue service, but was internally renumbered 1406.	None	None
1501–1502	Gillig	2007	Cummins ISB Diesel-Electric Hybrid	35' Low Floor BRT	The Connector (CityBus)	1501 – Retired September 4, 2020. Being used as a parts bus. Listed for auction in July 2021.; 1502 – Retired November 8, 2019 due to needing new batteries. Being used as a parts bus. Listed for auction in July 2021.	1501; 1502	1501; 1502
1503–1506	Gillig	2007	Cummins ISL	40' Low Floor BRT	1503 – Budget CityBus; 1504 – Lafayette Bank and Trust; 1505 – Budget CityBus; 1506 – Standard CityBus	1503 – All white with red stripe, blue numbers, and blue logo. Retired on April 28, 2021. Being used as a parts bus.; 1504 – Retired in Dec 2019. Used as a parts bus prior to sale. Listed for auction in July 2021.; 1505 – All white with red stripe, blue numbers, and blue logo. Retired on May 7, 2021. Being used as a parts bus.; 1506 – Retired on October 29, 2020. Used as a parts bus prior to sale. Listed for auction in July 2021.	1503; 1504; 1505; 1506	1503; 1504; 1505; 1506
1601–1602	Gillig	2007	Cummins ISB Diesel-Electric Hybrid	40' Low Floor BRT	1601 – Standard CityBus Hybrid; 1602 – The Connector (CityBus)	1601 – Retired on November 13, 2023. Being used as a parts bus.; 1602 – Retired on August 23, 2022. Being used as a parts bus.	1601; 1602	1601; 1602
1603	Gillig	2007	Cummins ISL	40' Low Floor BRT	CityBus We're Hiring Wrap	Retired on October 29, 2020. Being used as a parts bus. Listed for auction in July 2021.	Here	Here
1708	Gillig	2009	Cummins ISL	40' Low Floor BRT	Standard CityBus	Retired on November 16, 2021. Being used as a parts bus.	Here	Here

== See also ==
- List of bus transit systems in the United States
- Kokomo City-Line Trolley
- Lafayette station
