= Lafayette, Indiana =

City in Indiana, US

- City
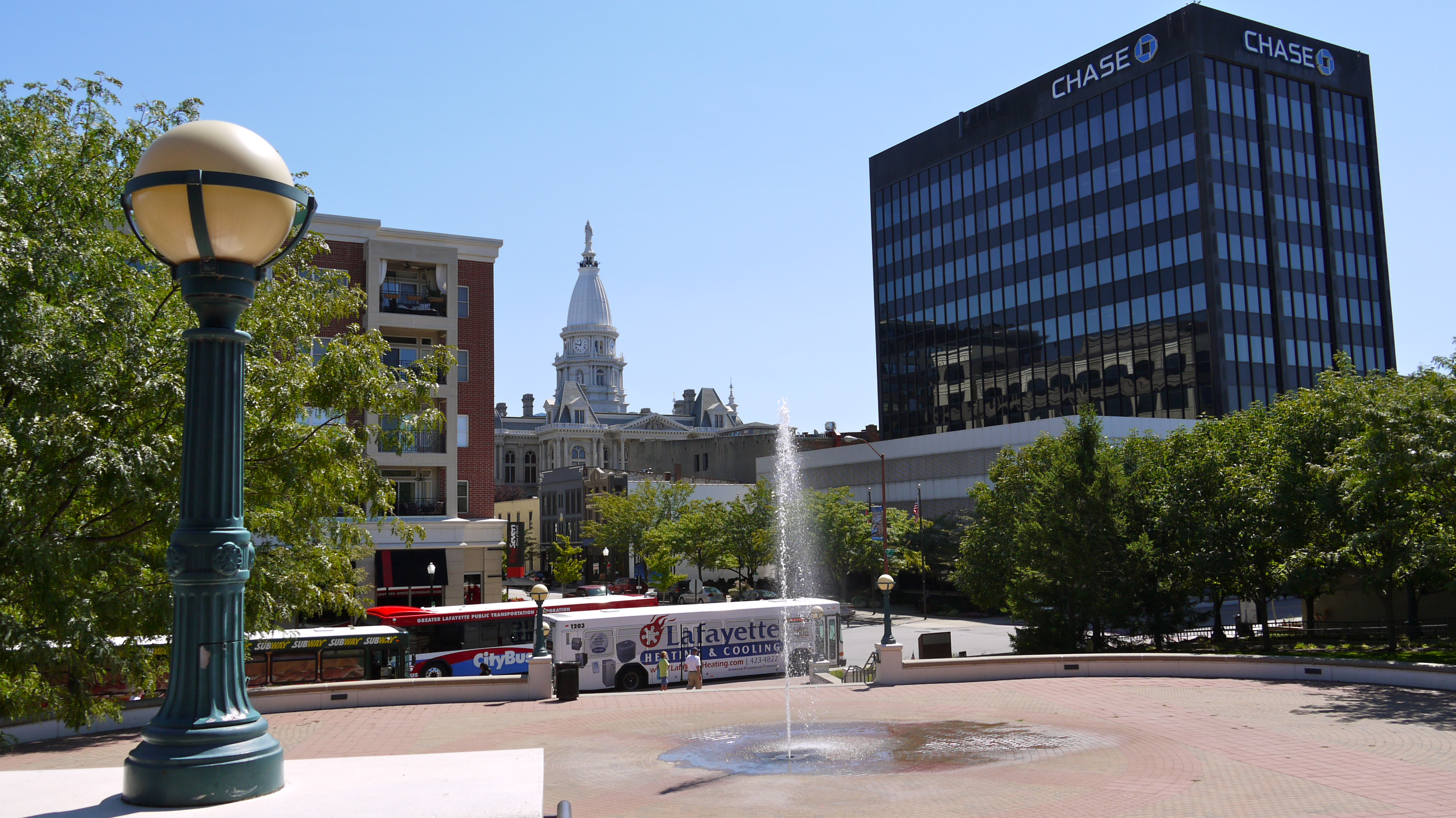
- Downtown Lafayette and the Riehle Plaza and CityBus depot

- Flag
- Nickname: "Star City"
- Interactive map of Lafayette, Indiana
- Location within Indiana Location within the United States
- Coordinates: 40°24′02″N 86°52′43″W
- Country: United States
- State: Indiana
- County: Tippecanoe
- Townships: Fairfield, Perry, Sheffield, Union, Wea
- Platted: 1825
- Incorporated: 1853
- Founder: William Digby
- Named for: General Lafayette

Government
  - Type: Mayor–council
  - Mayor: Tony Roswarski (D)

Area
  - City: 29.50 sq mi (76.41 km^{2})
  - Land: 29.38 sq mi (76.09 km^{2})
  - Water: 0.13 sq mi (0.33 km^{2})
  - Metro: 904.6 sq mi (2,343 km^{2})
- Elevation: 663 ft (202 m)

Population (2020)
  - City: 70,783
  - Density: 2,409.4/sq mi (930.27/km^{2})
  - Metro: 223,716 (205th)
- Time zone: UTC−5 (EST)
  - Summer (DST): UTC−4 (EDT)
- ZIP Code: 47901, 47904, 47905, 47909
- Area code: 765
- Interstate Highways: I-65
- U.S. Highways: US 52; US 231
- Major state roads: SR 25; SR 26; SR 38
- Waterways: Wabash River
- Airports: Purdue University Airport (West Lafayette)
- Public transit: CityBus
- FIPS code: 18-40788
- GNIS feature ID: 2395583
- Website: www.lafayette.in.gov

Lafayette (/ˌlɑːfiˈɛt, ˌlæf-/ LA(H)F-ee-ET) is a city in and the county seat of Tippecanoe County, Indiana, United States. The population was 70,783 at the 2020 census. It sits across the Wabash River from West Lafayette, home to Purdue University, which plays a major role in both communities. Together, Lafayette and West Lafayette make up the core of the Lafayette metropolitan area, home to 235,066 people in 2020.

Lafayette was founded in 1825 on the southeast bank of the Wabash River near where the river becomes impassable for riverboats upstream, though a French fort and trading post had existed since 1717 on the opposite bank and three miles downstream. It was named for the French general Marquis de Lafayette, a Revolutionary War hero. Lafayette is 63 miles (101 km) northwest of Indianapolis and 125 miles (201 km) southeast of Chicago.

== History ==
When European explorers arrived at this area, it was inhabited by a tribe of Miami Native Americans known as the Ouiatenon or Weas. In 1717, the French government established Fort Ouiatenon across the Wabash River and three miles (4.8 km) south of present-day Lafayette. The fort became the center of trade for fur trappers, merchants and Indians. An annual reenactment and festival known as Feast of the Hunters' Moon is held there each autumn.

Lafayette, 1868

The town of Lafayette was platted in May 1825 by William Digby, a trader. It was designated as the county seat of the newly formed Tippecanoe County the following year. Like many frontier towns, Lafayette was named for General Lafayette, a French officer who significantly aided George Washington's Continental Army during the American Revolutionary War. Lafayette toured the United States in 1824 and 1825.

In its earliest days, Lafayette was a shipping center on the Wabash River. In 1838, Henry Leavitt Ellsworth, the first United States Patent Commissioner, published a booklet titled Valley of the Upper Wabash, Indiana, with Hints on Its Agricultural Advantages, to promote settlement of the region. By 1845, Ellsworth had purchased 93,000 acres (380 km^{2}) of farmland around Lafayette and moved there from Connecticut to supervise land sales. By 1847 Ellsworth was distributing broadsides looking for farmers to purchase his farmland. He became president of the Tippecanoe County Agricultural Society in April 1851 – despite some local resentment over what was called "the Yale Crowd" – but he was defeated the same year when he ran for the Indiana House of Representatives. Ellsworth Street and Ellsworth Historic District are named for him.

The Wabash and Erie Canal in the 1840s stimulated trade and affirmed Lafayette's regional prominence. Railroads arrived in the town in the 1850s, connecting it with other major markets. The Monon Railroad connected Lafayette with other sections of Indiana.

Lafayette was the site of the first official airmail delivery in the United States on 17 August 1859, when John Wise piloted a balloon starting on the Lafayette courthouse grounds. Wise hoped to reach New York; however, weather conditions forced the balloon down near Crawfordsville, Indiana, and the mail reached its final destination by train. In 1959, the US Postal Service issued a 7¢ airmail stamp commemorating the centennial of the event.

== Geography ==
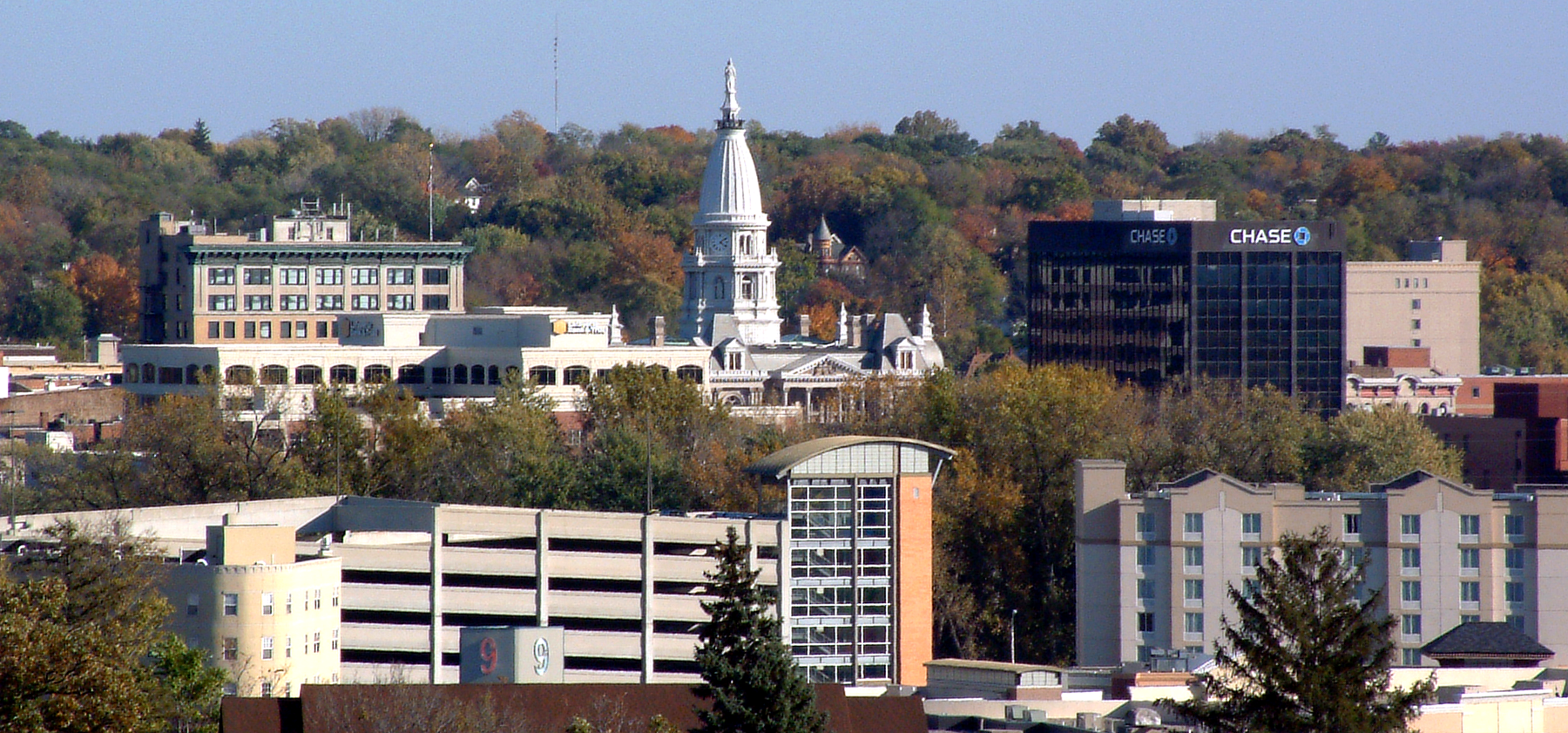
Lafayette skyline from West Lafayette

Lafayette is located in Fairfield and Wea Townships.

According to the 2010 census, Lafayette has a total area of 27.74 square miles (71.85 km^{2}), all land.

=== Neighborhoods ===
Neighborhoods include:

- 9th Street Hill
- Centennial
- Columbian Park
- Downtown
- Ellsworth Romig
- Glen Acres
- Hanna
- Hedgewood
- Highland Park
- Jefferson
- Jesco Hills Estates
- Lincoln
- Linnwood
- Monon
- Orchard Heights
- Perrin
- Potter Hollow
- St. Lawrence-McAllister
- St. Mary's
- Valley Center
- Vinton Highlands
- Vinton
- Wabash
- Wallace Triangle

Historic neighborhoods include Ninth Street Hill Neighborhood Historic District and Upper Main Street Historic District.

=== Climate ===
In recent years, temperatures in Lafayette have ranged from an average low of 17.7 °F (−7.9 °C) in January to an average high of 83.6 °F (28.7 °C) in July, although a record low of −25 °F (−32 °C) was recorded in January of both 1963 and 1994, and December 1989, and a record high of 106 °F (41 °C) was recorded in July 1954. Average monthly precipitation ranged from 1.95 in (50 mm) in February to 5.01 in (127 mm) in July. At most snowfall is 17 cm (6.7 in)

Climate data for Lafayette 8 S, Indiana (1991–2020 normals, extremes 1954–present)
Month	Jan	Feb	Mar	Apr	May	Jun	Jul	Aug	Sep	Oct	Nov	Dec	Year
Record high °F (°C)	66 (19)	74 (23)	85 (29)	89 (32)	95 (35)	104 (40)	106 (41)	98 (37)	102 (39)	92 (33)	80 (27)	71 (22)	106 (41)
Mean daily maximum °F (°C)	33.2 (0.7)	37.7 (3.2)	49.2 (9.6)	61.9 (16.6)	72.9 (22.7)	81.4 (27.4)	83.6 (28.7)	82.4 (28.0)	77.8 (25.4)	65.4 (18.6)	50.5 (10.3)	38.4 (3.6)	61.2 (16.2)
Daily mean °F (°C)	25.4 (−3.7)	29.2 (−1.6)	39.7 (4.3)	51.4 (10.8)	62.7 (17.1)	71.6 (22.0)	73.9 (23.3)	72.3 (22.4)	66.2 (19.0)	54.5 (12.5)	41.8 (5.4)	31.0 (−0.6)	51.6 (10.9)
Mean daily minimum °F (°C)	17.7 (−7.9)	20.7 (−6.3)	30.2 (−1.0)	40.9 (4.9)	52.5 (11.4)	61.7 (16.5)	64.2 (17.9)	62.1 (16.7)	54.6 (12.6)	43.6 (6.4)	33.0 (0.6)	23.5 (−4.7)	42.1 (5.6)
Record low °F (°C)	−25 (−32)	−23 (−31)	−15 (−26)	4 (−16)	24 (−4)	36 (2)	42 (6)	36 (2)	26 (−3)	19 (−7)	−2 (−19)	−25 (−32)	−25 (−32)
Average precipitation inches (mm)	2.45 (62)	1.95 (50)	2.70 (69)	3.91 (99)	4.37 (111)	5.01 (127)	4.26 (108)	3.68 (93)	2.96 (75)	2.98 (76)	3.17 (81)	2.39 (61)	39.83 (1,012)
Average snowfall inches (cm)	6.6 (17)	5.8 (15)	3.1 (7.9)	0.4 (1.0)	0.0 (0.0)	0.0 (0.0)	0.0 (0.0)	0.0 (0.0)	0.0 (0.0)	0.0 (0.0)	0.6 (1.5)	4.0 (10)	20.5 (52)
Average precipitation days (≥ 0.01 in)	10.0	8.5	10.0	11.7	12.5	11.0	9.4	8.6	7.9	9.6	10.0	9.9	119.1
Average snowy days (≥ 0.1 in)	4.0	3.2	1.4	0.2	0.0	0.0	0.0	0.0	0.0	0.0	0.6	2.6	12.0
Source 1: NOAA
Source 2: NOAA

Climate data for West Lafayette, Indiana (Purdue University Airport) 1991–2020 normals, extremes 1944–present
Month	Jan	Feb	Mar	Apr	May	Jun	Jul	Aug	Sep	Oct	Nov	Dec	Year
Record high °F (°C)	69 (21)	73 (23)	86 (30)	89 (32)	96 (36)	105 (41)	105 (41)	100 (38)	98 (37)	92 (33)	80 (27)	73 (23)	105 (41)
Mean daily maximum °F (°C)	33.4 (0.8)	38.0 (3.3)	49.5 (9.7)	61.9 (16.6)	72.5 (22.5)	81.2 (27.3)	83.8 (28.8)	82.7 (28.2)	77.2 (25.1)	64.5 (18.1)	50.0 (10.0)	38.2 (3.4)	61.1 (16.2)
Daily mean °F (°C)	25.8 (−3.4)	29.7 (−1.3)	40.0 (4.4)	51.1 (10.6)	61.6 (16.4)	70.7 (21.5)	73.6 (23.1)	72.2 (22.3)	65.5 (18.6)	53.7 (12.1)	41.3 (5.2)	31.0 (−0.6)	51.3 (10.7)
Mean daily minimum °F (°C)	18.2 (−7.7)	21.4 (−5.9)	30.4 (−0.9)	40.3 (4.6)	50.7 (10.4)	60.1 (15.6)	63.4 (17.4)	61.7 (16.5)	53.9 (12.2)	43.0 (6.1)	32.6 (0.3)	23.8 (−4.6)	41.6 (5.3)
Record low °F (°C)	−23 (−31)	−20 (−29)	−6 (−21)	7 (−14)	25 (−4)	35 (2)	43 (6)	37 (3)	29 (−2)	19 (−7)	5 (−15)	−16 (−27)	−23 (−31)
Average precipitation inches (mm)	2.19 (56)	1.78 (45)	2.73 (69)	3.84 (98)	4.04 (103)	4.56 (116)	4.08 (104)	3.12 (79)	2.59 (66)	2.91 (74)	2.87 (73)	2.29 (58)	37.00 (940)
Average precipitation days (≥ 0.01 in)	9.3	8.1	10.6	11.6	12.6	12.6	11.8	10.4	9.4	9.5	10.1	10.3	126.3
Source 1: NOAA
Source 2: NOAA

== Demographics ==
Historical population
Census	Pop.	Note	%±
1850	6,129		—
1860	9,387		53.2%
1870	13,506		43.9%
1880	14,860		10.0%
1890	16,243		9.3%
1900	18,116		11.5%
1910	20,081		10.8%
1920	22,486		12.0%
1930	26,240		16.7%
1940	28,798		9.7%
1950	35,558		23.5%
1960	42,330		19.0%
1970	44,955		6.2%
1980	43,011		−4.3%
1990	43,764		1.8%
2000	56,397		28.9%
2010	67,140		19.0%
2020	70,783		5.4%
2025 (est.)	71,238		0.6%
U.S. Decennial Census

Lafayette is the larger principal city of the Lafayette-Frankfort CSA, a Combined Statistical Area that includes the Lafayette metropolitan area (Benton, Carroll, and Tippecanoe counties) and the Frankfort micropolitan area (Clinton County), which had a combined population of 212,408 at the 2000 United States census.

=== 2020 census ===
As of the 2020 census, Lafayette had a population of 70,783. The median age was 33.3 years. 23.4% of residents were under the age of 18 and 13.9% of residents were 65 years of age or older. For every 100 females there were 96.4 males, and for every 100 females age 18 and over there were 94.6 males age 18 and over.

100.0% of residents lived in urban areas, while 0.0% lived in rural areas.

There were 30,920 households in Lafayette, of which 27.0% had children under the age of 18 living in them. Of all households, 32.4% were married-couple households, 25.1% were households with a male householder and no spouse or partner present, and 32.7% were households with a female householder and no spouse or partner present. About 37.8% of all households were made up of individuals and 11.0% had someone living alone who was 65 years of age or older.

There were 33,659 housing units, of which 8.1% were vacant. The homeowner vacancy rate was 1.5% and the rental vacancy rate was 9.5%.

Racial composition as of the 2020 census
Race	Number	Percent
White	50,306	71.1%
Black or African American	7,458	10.5%
American Indian and Alaska Native	389	0.5%
Asian	1,303	1.8%
Native Hawaiian and Other Pacific Islander	17	0.0%
Some other race	4,862	6.9%
Two or more races	6,448	9.1%
Hispanic or Latino (of any race)	10,507	14.8%

=== 2010 census ===
As of the 2010 United States census, there were 67,140 people, 28,545 households, and 15,863 families in the city. The population density was 2,420.3 inhabitants per square mile (934.5/km^{2}). There were 31,260 housing units at an average density of 1,126.9 units per square mile (435.1 units/km^{2}). The racial makeup of the city was 74.2% White, 11.2% African American, 0.4% Native American, 1% Asian, 0.0% from other races, and 2.7% from two or more races. Hispanic or Latino of any race were 16.3% of the population.

There were 28,545 households, of which 29.4% had children under the age of 18 living with them, 36.7% were married couples living together, 13.7% had a female householder with no husband present, 5.2% had a male householder with no wife present, and 44.4% were non-families. 34.9% of all households were made up of individuals, and 9% had someone living alone who was 65 years of age or older. The average household size was 2.30 and the average family size was 3.00.

The median age in the city was 31.9 years. 23.8% of residents were under the age of 18; 12.9% were between the ages of 18 and 24; 29.9% were from 25 to 44; 22.2% were from 45 to 64, and 11.3% were 65 years of age or older. The gender makeup of the city was 48.7% male and 51.3% female.

=== 2000 census ===
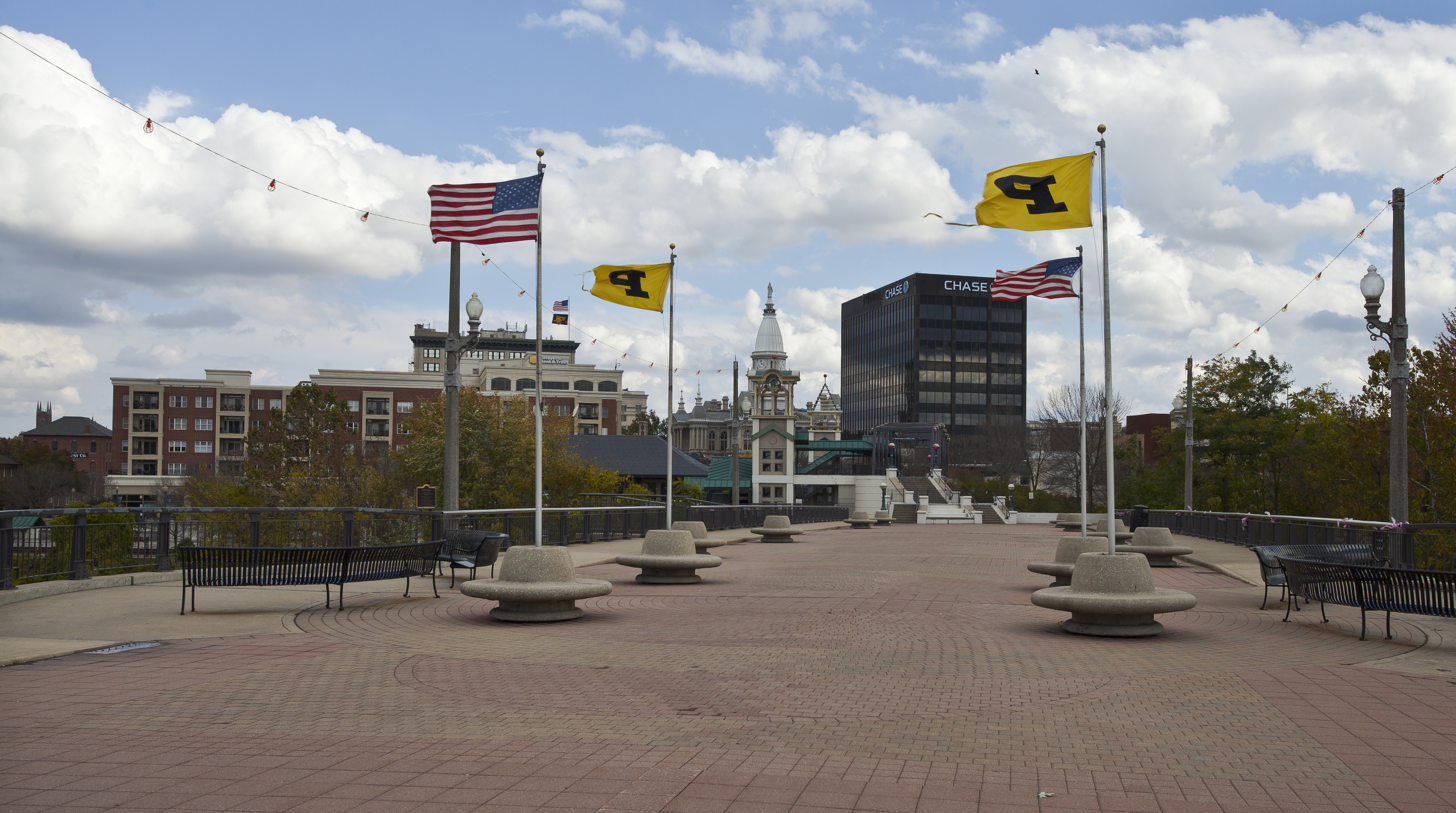
Lafayette from Main Street Bridge

As of the 2000 United States census, there were 56,397 people, 24,060 households, and 13,666 families in the city. The population density was 2,806.5 inhabitants per square mile (1,083.6/km^{2}). There were 25,602 housing units at an average density of 1,274.1 units per square mile (491.9 units/km^{2}). The racial makeup of the city was 88.91% White; 3.22% African American; 0.37% Native American; 1.22% Asian; 0.04% Pacific Islander; 4.61% from other races, and 1.62% from two or more races. Hispanic or Latino of any race were 9.11% of the population.

There were 24,060 households, out of which 27.0% had children under the age of 18 living with them; 42.5% were married couples living together; 10.2% had a female householder with no husband present; and 43.2% were non-families. 33.2% of all households were made up of individuals, and 9.4% had someone living alone who was 65 years of age or older. The average household size was 2.31 individuals and the average family size was 2.98.

The city population contained 23.2% under the age of 18; 14.2% from 18 to 24; 31.3% from 25 to 44; 19.3% from 45 to 64; and 12.0% who were 65 years of age or older. The median age was 32 years. For every 100 females, there were 97.7 males. For every 100 females age 18 and over, there were 95.3 males.

The median income for a household in the city was $35,859, and the median income for a family was $45,480. Males had a median income of $32,892 versus $23,049 for females. The per capita income for the city was $19,217. About 8.0% of families and 12.1% of the population were below the poverty line, including 15.8% of those under age 18 and 4.6% of those age 65 or over.

== Economy ==
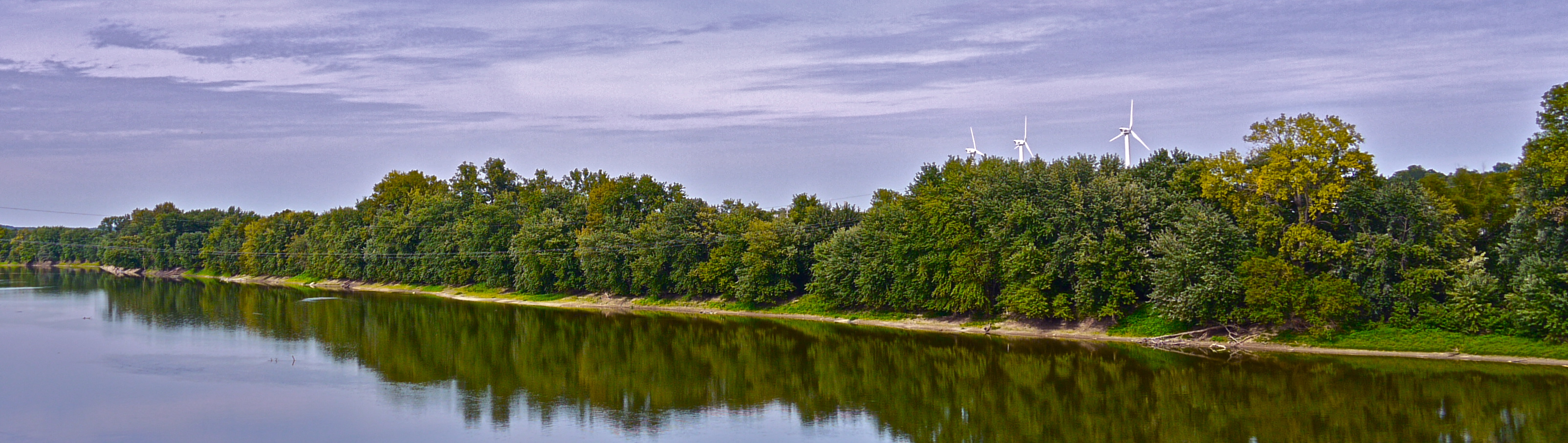
Wabash River, and wind turbines at CityBus facility

Companies located in Lafayette include:

- Wabash National, world's largest manufacturer of semi-truck trailers
- Subaru of Indiana Automotive, the only non-Japanese producer of Subaru vehicles.
- Evonik (Tippecanoe Laboratories) pharmaceuticals/chemicals
- Primient, corn wet mill and refinery producing corn syrup
- Landis+Gyr, manufacturer of electric meters for global ANSI markets
- Caterpillar, Large Engine Center

== Arts and culture ==
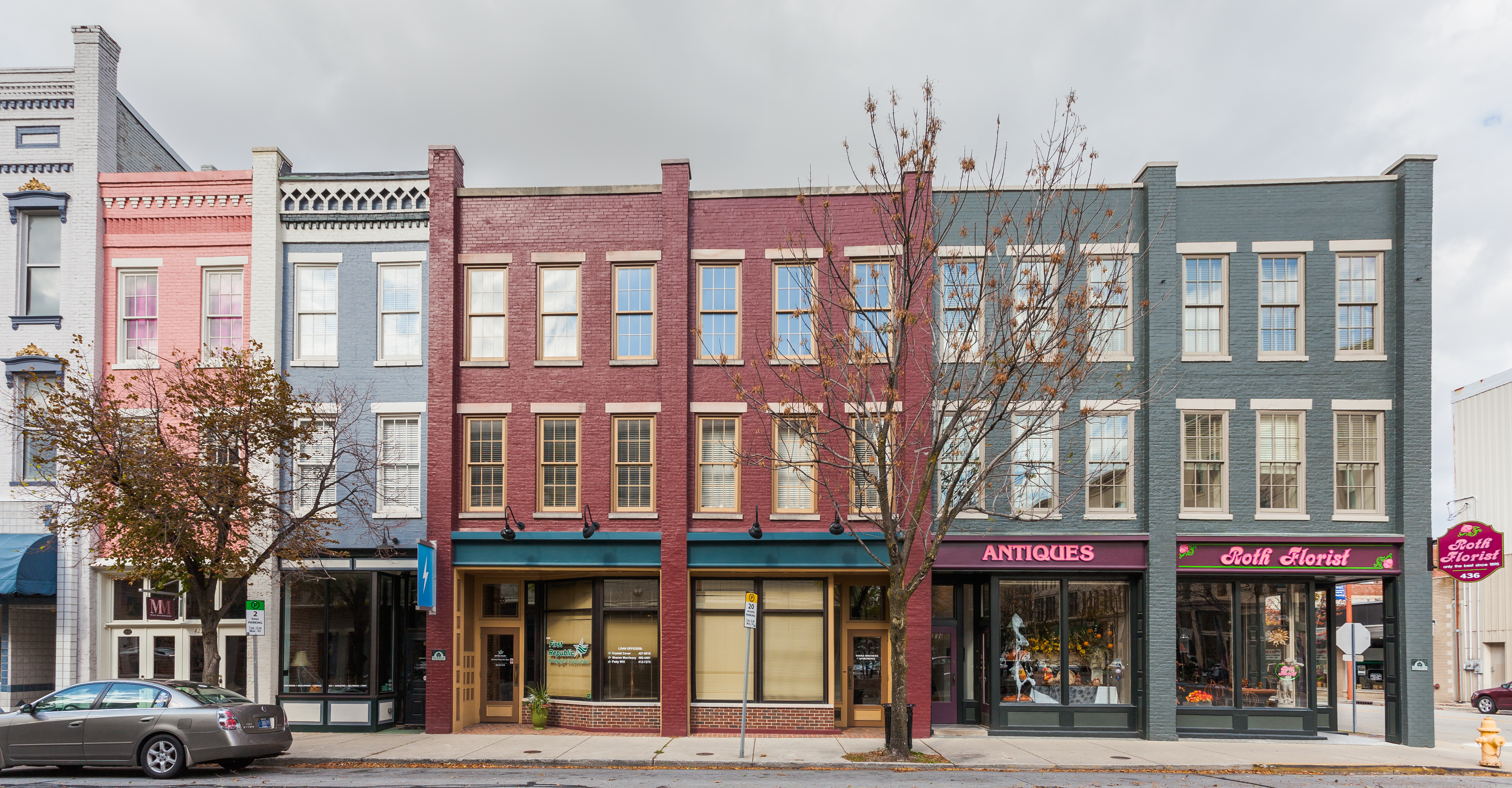
Main Street

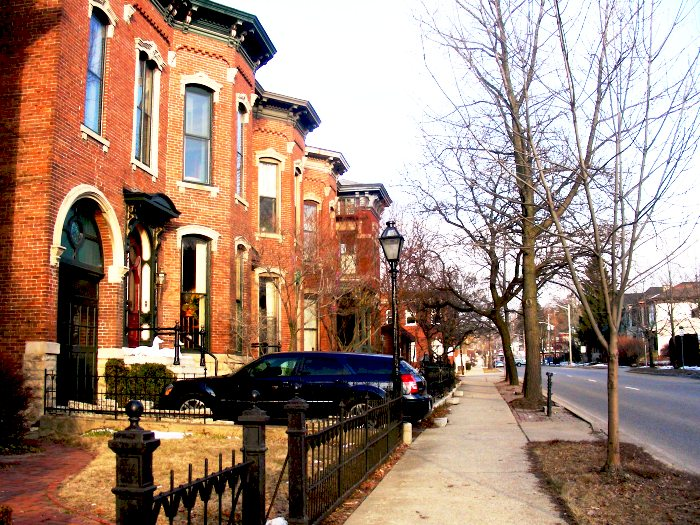
South Street historic row

=== Festivals ===
- A Taste of Tippecanoe

=== Public library ===
The Lafayette area has four branch locations of the Tippecanoe County Public Library:

- Downtown Library
- Wyandotte Branch
- West Lafayette Klondike Branch
- Wea Prairie Branch

=== Points of interest ===
- Haan Mansion Museum of Indiana Art

=== Notable buildings ===
- Judge Cyrus Ball House, listed on the National Register of Historic Places
- James H. Ward House, listed on the National Register of Historic Places
- Temple Israel, 17 South 7th St. - one of the nation's oldest surviving synagogue buildings.
- Trinity United Methodist Church (Trinity Methodist Episcopal Church until 1969) – the first church congregation in the Lafayette area. Its current building was erected in 1869 by William Heath and has remained intact to this day.
- Tippecanoe Mall - the city's main shopping center.
- Tippecanoe County Courthouse - built 1882–1884 at a cost of around $500,000 (double the original estimate).

== Government ==
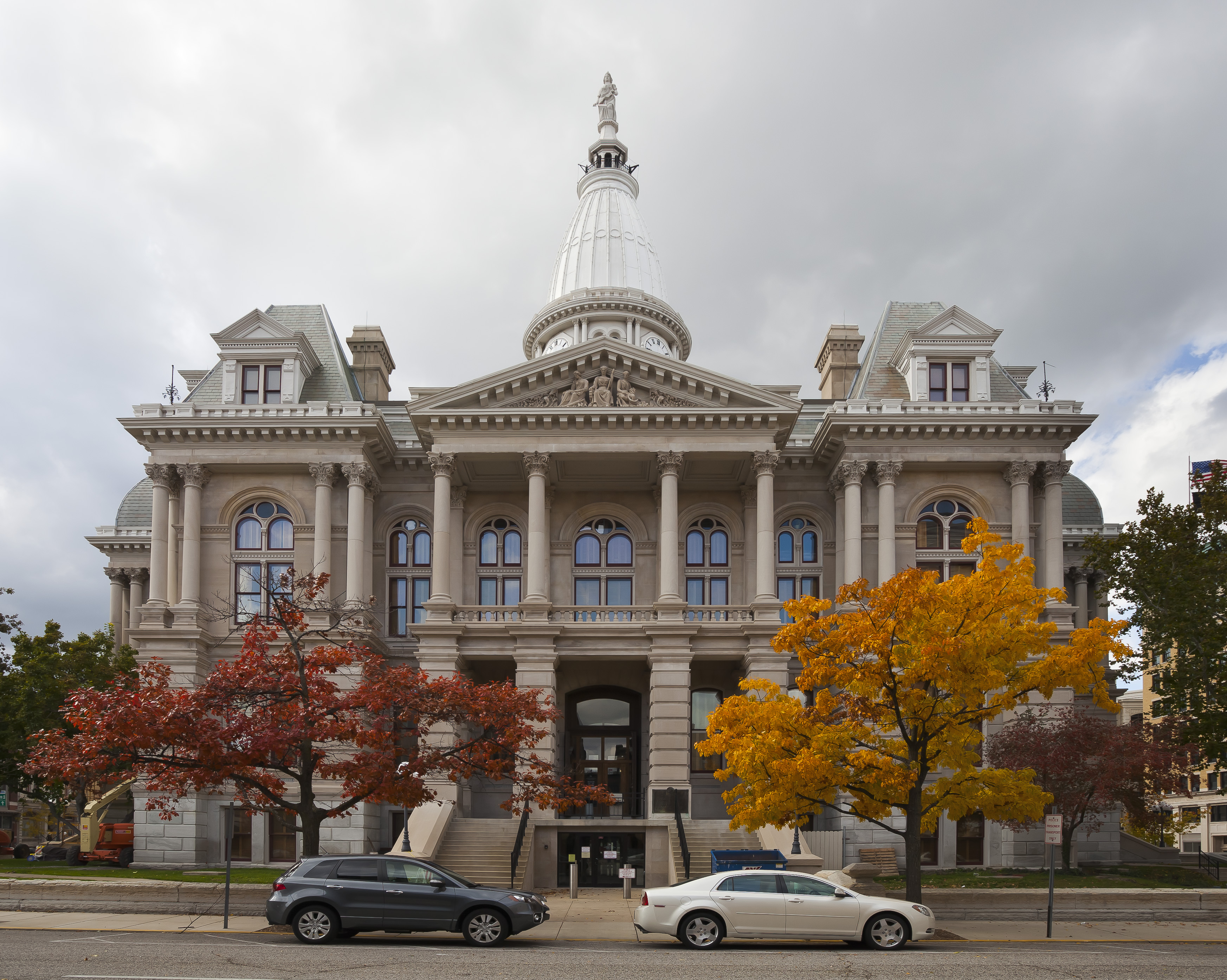
Tippecanoe County Courthouse

The government consists of a mayor – elected in a citywide vote – and a city council of nine members. Six are elected from individual districts; three are elected at-large.

== Education ==
=== Colleges ===
- Ivy Tech Community College of Indiana
- A location of the Purdue Polytechnic Institute, one of Purdue University's academic colleges

=== Public school ===
K-12 public education in the majority of the Lafayette city limits is provided by the Lafayette School Corporation, which operates Jefferson High School and other schools. The Tippecanoe School Corporation covers some outerlying portions of the Lafayette city limits; its schools are nearby. The Tippecanoe district operates McCutcheon High School and William Henry Harrison High School, which cover these outerlying parts.

New Community School was a tuition-free elementary charter school (sponsored by Ball State University) located on the north side of Lafayette; it closed in 2016.

Beacon Academy was a charter school operated by the Lafayette School Corporation in West Lafayette; it closed in 2018.

=== Private ===
Elementary

- Lafayette Christian School
- St. Boniface Elementary
- St. Lawrence Elementary
- St. Mary Cathedral Elementary
- St. James Lutheran Elementary/Middle School

Middle School

- St. Boniface Middle School

Junior/High School

- Catholic Central Junior-Senior High School

K-12

- Faith Christian School

== Media ==
=== Newspapers ===
- Journal & Courier. The newspaper, which serves the Greater Lafayette area, has its newsroom and offices located in downtown Lafayette. Journal & Courier also has its own printing services for itself and other papers in the region on the eastside of Lafayette.
- Purdue Exponent. Purdue University's independent student newspaper serves Purdue, West Lafayette, and Lafayette, and has its newsroom and offices located off campus on Northwestern Avenue in West Lafayette.
- The Lafayette Leader

=== Television ===
- WPBI-LD 16 (Fox; NBC on LD2; ABC on LD3)
- WLFI-TV 18 (CBS; CW on DT2; ION on DT3; GetTV on DT4; Start TV on DT5)
- WPBY-LD 35 (ABC; MeTV/MyNetworkTV on LD2)

From 1953 until the 2016 launch of WPBI-LD, WLFI-TV had been the only "Big Three" (ABC, CBS and NBC—or, including Fox, "big four") commercial network television broadcaster in the Lafayette market. With the 2017 launch of WPBY-LD, local broadcasts of all "big four" networks became available. Lafayette also remains one of few television markets without its own PBS station, the market being served by WFYI in Indianapolis.

For decades, cable and satellite providers in Lafayette had supplemented the area with Indianapolis stations WRTV, WTHR, WTTV, and WXIN, the respective ABC, NBC, CBS, and Fox affiliates, as "out-of-market" stations. All remain viewable in the area via a large over-the-air antenna or, in some cases, via a subscription satellite or streaming service. Comcast Xfinity, the main cable provider in the city, discontinued its remaining carriage of Indianapolis-based "big four" stations on March 7, 2018, but resumed carriage of WTHR and WRTV two days later.

=== Radio ===
==== Commercial ====
- WASK
- WASK-FM
- WAZY-FM
- WKHY-FM
- WKOA-FM
- WLQQ
- WBPE
- WSHY-AM
- WXXB-FM
- WYCM

==== Non-commercial ====
- WBAA (AM)
- WBAA-FM
- WHPL-FM
- WJEF-FM
- WQSG-FM
- WTGO-LP FM
- WWCC-LP FM

== Infrastructure ==
=== Transportation ===
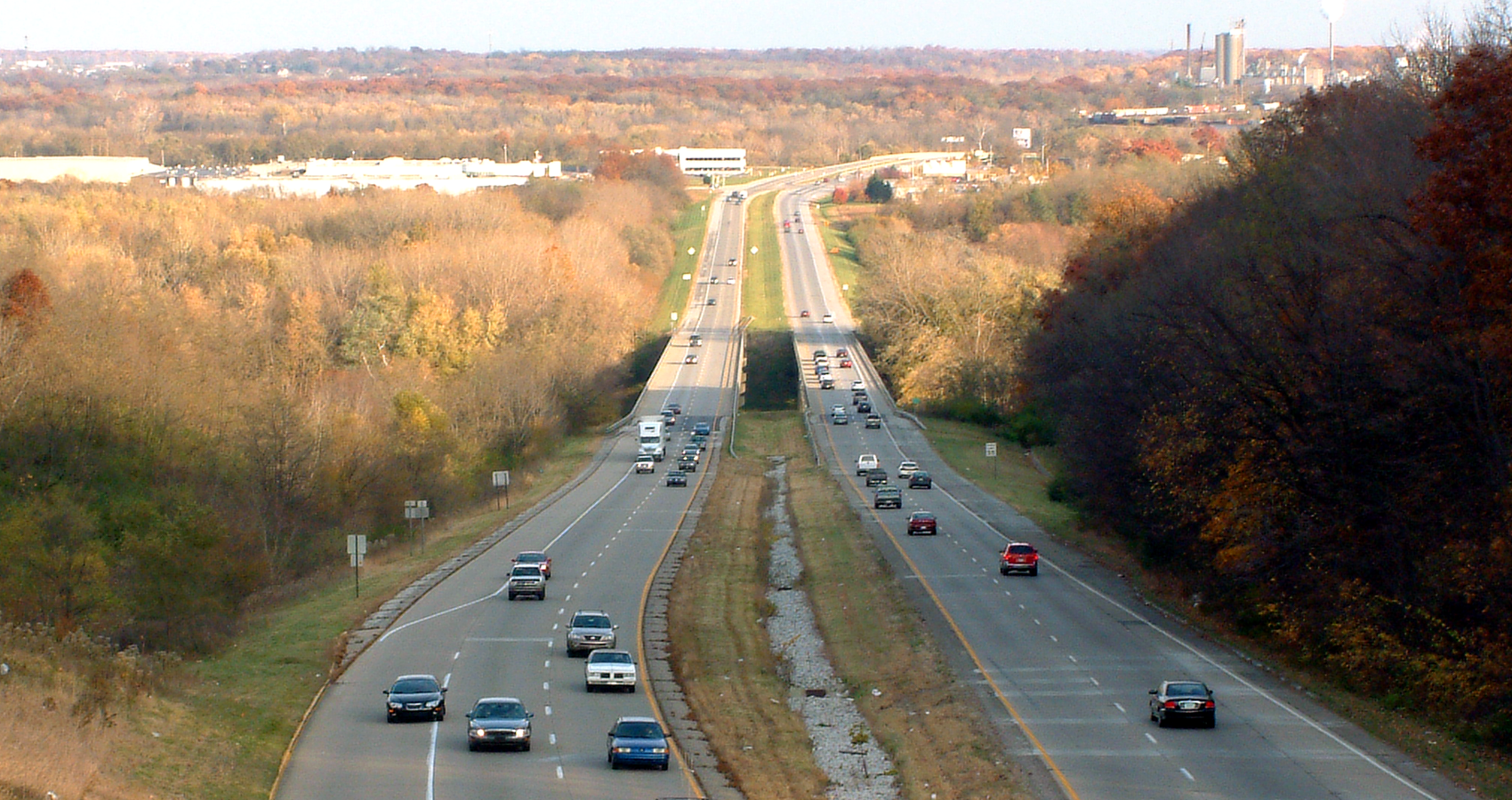
Sagamore Parkway (as seen from West Lafayette)

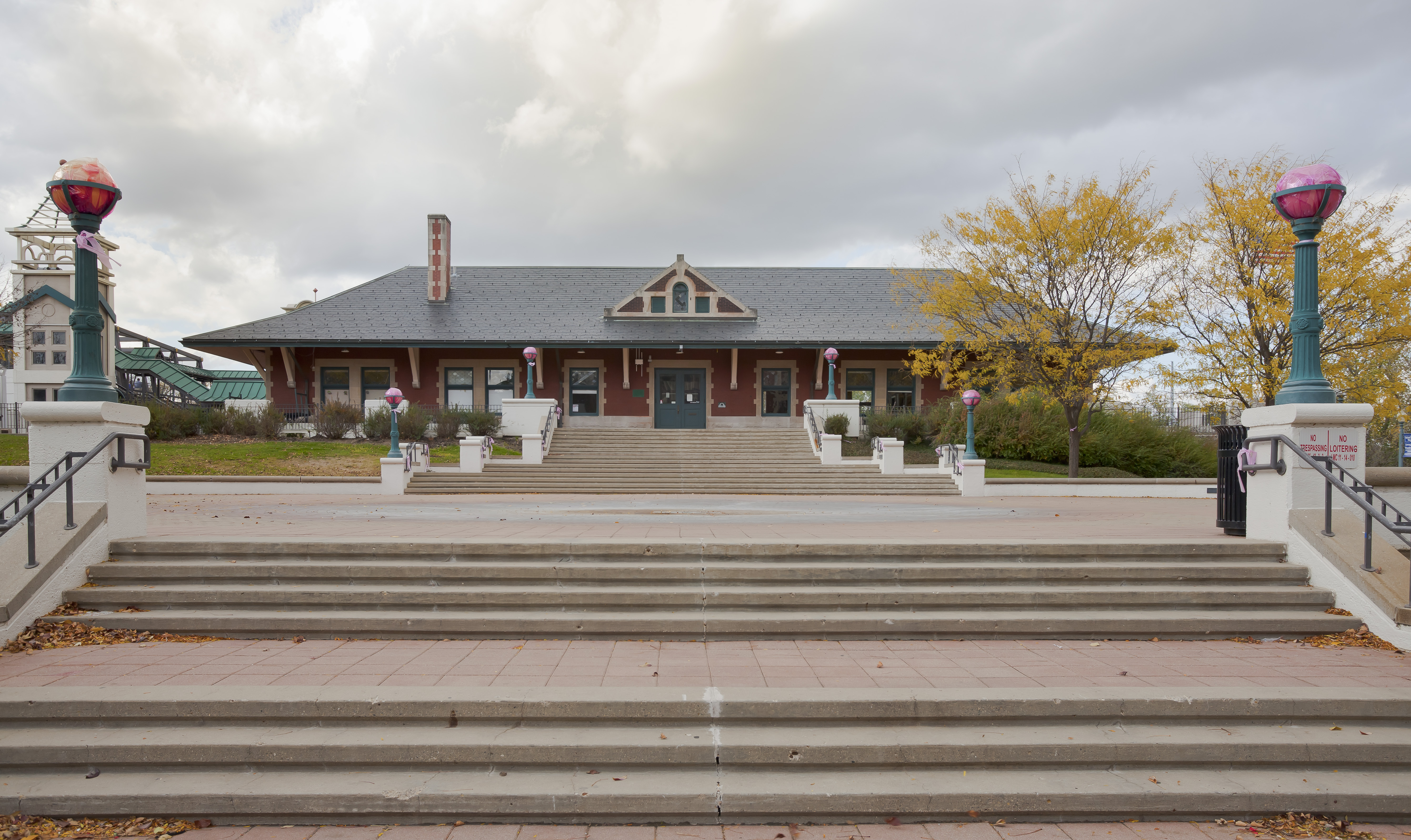
Riehle Plaza and the railway station

==== Airport ====
No airports are located within Lafayette city limits. The nearest commercial airport which currently has scheduled airline service is the Purdue University Airport (LAF) in West Lafayette.

==== Highways ====
- Interstate 65 to Gary, Indiana (near Chicago) and Indianapolis
- US 52 to Joliet, Illinois (also near Chicago) and Indianapolis
- US 231 to Rensselaer, Indiana and Owensboro, Kentucky
- State Road 25
- State Road 26
- State Road 38

==== Railroads ====
Amtrak, the national passenger rail system, provides passenger rail service to Lafayette through the Cardinal to Chicago, Washington D.C., and New York City. Norfolk Southern; CSX Transportation; Kankakee, Beaverville and Southern Railroad; and Toledo, Peoria and Western Railway (RailAmerica) provide freight rail service. Many lines that originally passed through the downtown were redirected in the mid-1990s to a rail corridor near the Wabash River.

==== Buses and shuttles ====
- CityBus local bus service by the Greater Lafayette Public Transportation Corporation
- Greyhound intercity bus service
- Flixbus stops here between Chicago and Indianapolis / Bloomington
- Lafayette Limo and Reindeer Shuttle to Indianapolis International Airport and O'Hare International Airport

== Notable people ==
=== Entertainment ===
- Karen Black – actress, attended Lafayette Jefferson High School
- Jeremy Camp – Christian recording artist
- Eric Carlson - lead guitarist, songwriter, founding member of the Mentors
- Embeth Davidtz – film and television actress
- Louise Fazenda – film actor whose career spanned silent and talking movies
- Circuit Des Yeux - musician
- Charles Foley – co-inventor of the game Twister
- Mass Giorgini – musician and record producer
- Troy Hickman – writer best known for his comic book work (Common Grounds, Twilight Guardian, City of Heroes, Witchblade, Turok)
- Shannon Hoon – former lead vocalist of rock band Blind Melon
- John Korty – director, screenwriter, known for The Autobiography of Miss Jane Pittman and documentary Who Are the DeBolts? And Where Did They Get Nineteen Kids?
- Claudia Lee – television actress, Hart of Dixie
- Jason Marnocha – voice actor
- Curt McDowell - director, writer, actor, artist
- Larry McNeely – musician, banjo player with Glen Campbell and for film soundtracks
- Tammy Lynn Michaels – television actor
- Ken Navarro – smooth jazz guitarist
- Chubby Parker – country music radio personality and recording artist
- Sydney Pollack – film actor, director, and producer
- Victor Potel – silent film actor
- Axl Rose – co-founder and lead vocalist of rock band Guns N' Roses
- Julia Scheeres – author, best known for ALA Alex Award-winning memoir Jesus Land
- Izzy Stradlin – songwriter, co-founder and former rhythm guitarist of rock band Guns N' Roses
- Henry Stram - actor

=== Sports ===
- William Fritz Afflis known professionally as "Dick the Bruiser" – professional football player and wrestler; graduated from Lafayette Jefferson High School
- Eric Bruntlett – professional baseball player
- Clem Crowe – professional football and basketball player
- Todd Dunwoody – professional baseball player
- Ray Ewry – 10-time Olympic champion in track and field
- Bernard "Bernie" Flowers – college and professional football player; born in Cleveland area, lived in Lafayette
- Bob Friend – professional baseball player
- Dustin Keller – professional football player; graduated from Lafayette Jefferson High School
- Pete Halsmer – professional race car driver
- Charles Kirkpatrick – professional race car driver
- Josh Lindblom – professional baseball player
- Chukie Nwokorie – professional football player; graduated from Lafayette Jefferson High School
- Clayton Richard – professional baseball player; graduated from McCutcheon High School
- Erik Sabel – professional baseball player
- Justin Smith – football player
- George Souders – professional race car driver (1927)

=== Business, law, politics ===
- Roger D. Branigin – Governor of Indiana 1965–1969
- John Burger – member of the Minnesota House of Representatives
- Steve Carter – Indiana Attorney General
- Henry Leavitt Ellsworth – first Commissioner of the United States Patent and Trademark Office; real estate developer
- Henry W. Ellsworth – son of Henry Leavitt Ellsworth, attorney, poet, author and Minister to Sweden
- David W. Evans – US Representative, 6th Congressional District Indiana 1975–1983
- Dan Flanagan – Justice of the Indiana Supreme Court
- Lucinda Florio (1947–2022), teacher and advocate for education and literacy, who, as the wife of former New Jersey Governor James Florio, served as the First Lady of New Jersey
- Clara Shortridge Foltz (1849–1934) – first female lawyer on the West Coast
- Joseph Garcia – former Lieutenant Governor of Colorado
- Herman Joseph Justin – founded Justin Boot Company
- Brian Lamb – founder of C-SPAN
- Bill Long – state representative
- Frank Posegate – journalist, mayor of St. Joseph, Missouri
- John Purdue – Purdue Block, Tippecanoe County founder, founding benefactor of Purdue University
- Barbara Ringer – first female register of copyrights
- Alvah Curtis Roebuck – founded Sears, Roebuck and Company
- Neal Mohan – CEO of YouTube

=== Academic, science, technology ===
- Eric J. Barron – 14th President of Florida State University, 18th President of Penn State
- Herbert C. Brown – Nobel Prize laureate in chemistry
- Christopher L. Eisgruber – 20th President of Princeton University
- Daniel X. Freedman – pioneer in biological psychiatry, discovered link of hallucinogens to brain transmitters
- Kenneth E. Goodson – mechanical engineer
- J. Andrew McCammon – physical and theoretical chemist
- Donald E. Williams – astronaut
- Ian Murdock – software engineer, created Debian

=== Other ===
- Emily Thornton Charles, poet, journalist
- Benjaman Kyle, known for identity loss due to dissociative amnesia
- Evaleen Stein (1863–1923), author, limner

== Sister cities ==
Lafayette has two sister cities as designated by Sister Cities International.

- Longkou, Shandong, China
- Ōta, Gunma, Japan (October 1993)
