= Mars Theatre =

United States historic place

- U.S. National Register of Historic Places
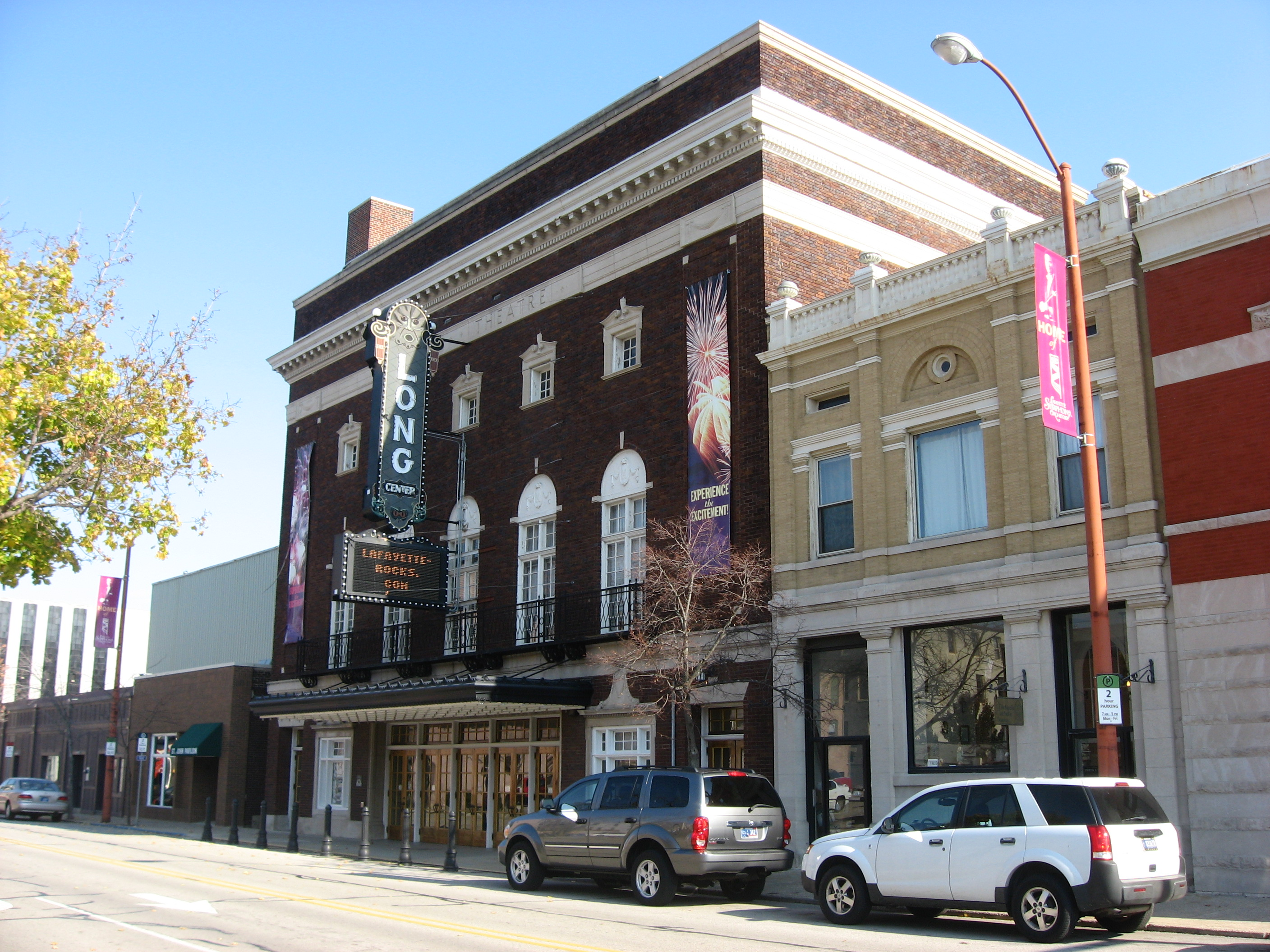
- Mars Theatre, November 2009

- Location within Tippecanoe County, Indiana Location within Indiana Location within the United States
- Location: 111 N. 6th St., Lafayette, Indiana
- Coordinates: 40°25′6″N 86°53′25″W
- Area: less than one acre
- Built: 1921
- Architect: Nicol, Scholer, & Hoffman; Kemmer Construction Co.
- Architectural style: Colonial Revival, Georgian Revival
- NRHP reference No.: 81000030
- Added to NRHP: January 26, 1981

Mars Theatre is a historic theatre building in Lafayette, Indiana. It was built in 1921, and is a four-story, rectangular, Georgian Revival style brick building, with limestone ornamentation and terra cotta panels. It measures 69 feet, 4 inches, wide and 141 feet, 4 inches deep. It was originally built as a vaudeville theater and sat 1,205 patrons. The building houses the Denis H. Long Center for the Performing Arts.

It was listed on the National Register of Historic Places in 1981.
