= Scott Street Pavilion =

- U.S. National Register of Historic Places
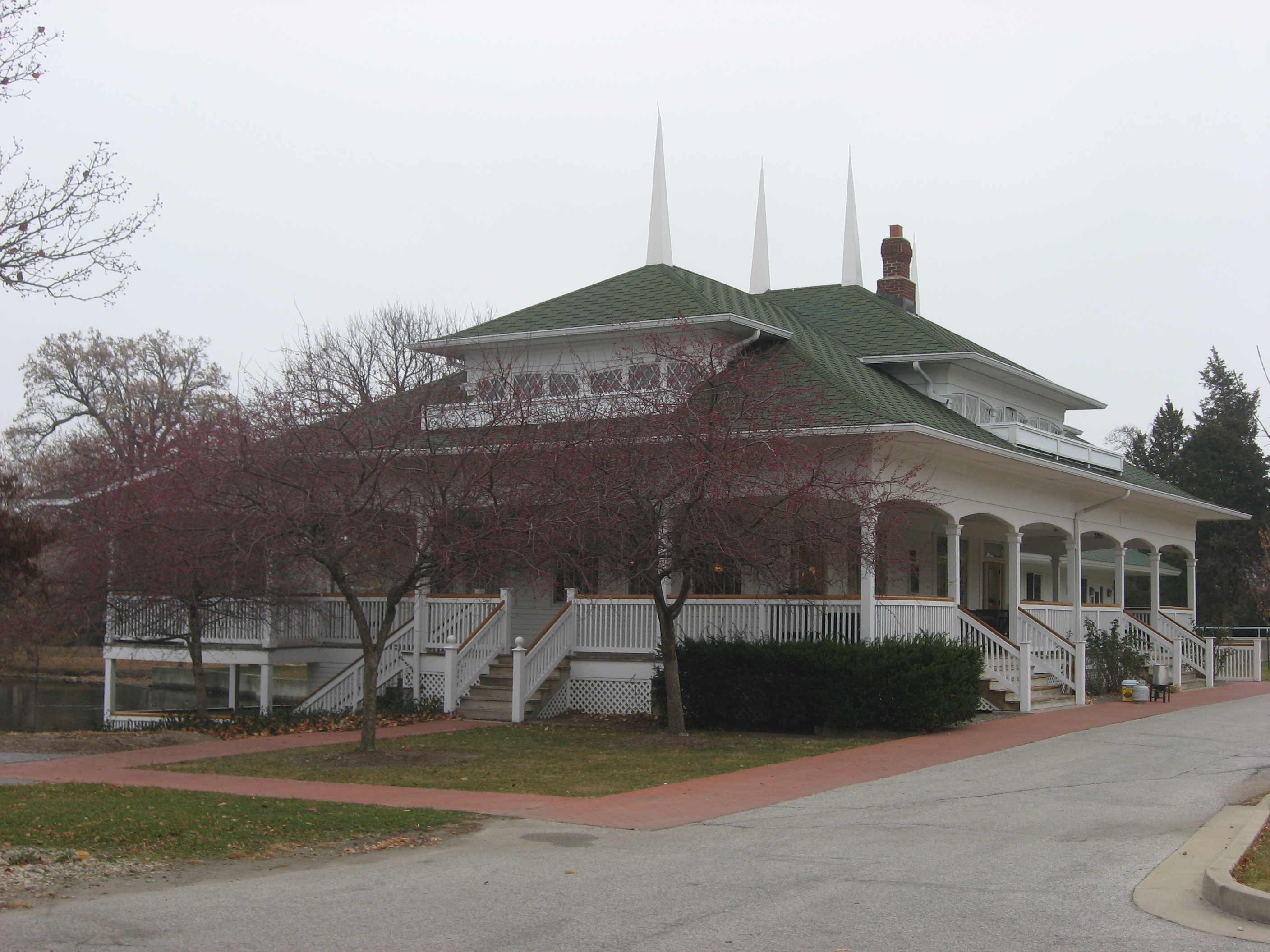
- Scott Street Pavilion, November 2010

- Location within Tippecanoe County, Indiana Location within Indiana Location within the United States
- Location: Columbian Park, Lafayette, Indiana
- Coordinates: 40°24′54″N 86°52′18″W
- Area: 0.2 acres (0.081 ha)
- Built: 1899
- Architect: Levandowski, Peter
- NRHP reference No.: 84001656
- Added to NRHP: September 27, 1984

Scott Street Pavilion is a historic park pavilion located in Columbian Park at Lafayette, Indiana. It was built in 1899, and is a 1 1/2-story, rectangular, wood-frame building. It is sheathed in clapboard siding and has a hipped roof that extends to form a veranda on all sides.

It was listed on the National Register of Historic Places in 1984.
